

38001–38100 

|-bgcolor=#E9E9E9
| 38001 ||  || — || May 22, 1998 || Socorro || LINEAR || — || align=right | 4.9 km || 
|-id=002 bgcolor=#E9E9E9
| 38002 ||  || — || May 27, 1998 || Anderson Mesa || LONEOS || — || align=right | 6.4 km || 
|-id=003 bgcolor=#d6d6d6
| 38003 ||  || — || May 22, 1998 || Socorro || LINEAR || — || align=right | 9.8 km || 
|-id=004 bgcolor=#E9E9E9
| 38004 ||  || — || May 22, 1998 || Socorro || LINEAR || — || align=right | 4.3 km || 
|-id=005 bgcolor=#d6d6d6
| 38005 ||  || — || May 22, 1998 || Socorro || LINEAR || ALA || align=right | 14 km || 
|-id=006 bgcolor=#E9E9E9
| 38006 ||  || — || May 22, 1998 || Socorro || LINEAR || — || align=right | 4.0 km || 
|-id=007 bgcolor=#E9E9E9
| 38007 ||  || — || May 23, 1998 || Socorro || LINEAR || — || align=right | 4.3 km || 
|-id=008 bgcolor=#E9E9E9
| 38008 ||  || — || May 23, 1998 || Socorro || LINEAR || — || align=right | 5.6 km || 
|-id=009 bgcolor=#E9E9E9
| 38009 ||  || — || May 23, 1998 || Socorro || LINEAR || — || align=right | 4.7 km || 
|-id=010 bgcolor=#E9E9E9
| 38010 ||  || — || May 23, 1998 || Socorro || LINEAR || EUN || align=right | 4.0 km || 
|-id=011 bgcolor=#E9E9E9
| 38011 ||  || — || May 23, 1998 || Socorro || LINEAR || — || align=right | 4.6 km || 
|-id=012 bgcolor=#E9E9E9
| 38012 ||  || — || May 23, 1998 || Socorro || LINEAR || — || align=right | 2.8 km || 
|-id=013 bgcolor=#E9E9E9
| 38013 ||  || — || May 23, 1998 || Socorro || LINEAR || — || align=right | 3.5 km || 
|-id=014 bgcolor=#E9E9E9
| 38014 ||  || — || May 23, 1998 || Socorro || LINEAR || — || align=right | 2.8 km || 
|-id=015 bgcolor=#E9E9E9
| 38015 ||  || — || May 22, 1998 || Socorro || LINEAR || — || align=right | 8.2 km || 
|-id=016 bgcolor=#E9E9E9
| 38016 ||  || — || May 27, 1998 || Socorro || LINEAR || — || align=right | 4.7 km || 
|-id=017 bgcolor=#E9E9E9
| 38017 ||  || — || May 26, 1998 || Socorro || LINEAR || — || align=right | 4.8 km || 
|-id=018 bgcolor=#d6d6d6
| 38018 Louisneefs ||  ||  || June 1, 1998 || La Silla || E. W. Elst || — || align=right | 8.0 km || 
|-id=019 bgcolor=#d6d6d6
| 38019 Jeanmariepelt ||  ||  || June 1, 1998 || La Silla || E. W. Elst || URS || align=right | 12 km || 
|-id=020 bgcolor=#d6d6d6
| 38020 Hannadam || 1998 MP ||  || June 17, 1998 || San Marcello || L. Tesi, A. Boattini || — || align=right | 4.9 km || 
|-id=021 bgcolor=#E9E9E9
| 38021 ||  || — || June 16, 1998 || Kitt Peak || Spacewatch || AGN || align=right | 3.7 km || 
|-id=022 bgcolor=#d6d6d6
| 38022 ||  || — || June 19, 1998 || Caussols || ODAS || — || align=right | 3.9 km || 
|-id=023 bgcolor=#d6d6d6
| 38023 ||  || — || June 26, 1998 || La Silla || E. W. Elst || — || align=right | 4.7 km || 
|-id=024 bgcolor=#d6d6d6
| 38024 Melospadafora || 1998 OB ||  || July 16, 1998 || Caussols || ODAS || — || align=right | 7.0 km || 
|-id=025 bgcolor=#d6d6d6
| 38025 || 1998 QF || — || August 17, 1998 || Prescott || P. G. Comba || — || align=right | 11 km || 
|-id=026 bgcolor=#E9E9E9
| 38026 ||  || — || August 17, 1998 || Socorro || LINEAR || — || align=right | 5.3 km || 
|-id=027 bgcolor=#d6d6d6
| 38027 ||  || — || August 17, 1998 || Socorro || LINEAR || — || align=right | 11 km || 
|-id=028 bgcolor=#d6d6d6
| 38028 ||  || — || August 17, 1998 || Socorro || LINEAR || — || align=right | 8.3 km || 
|-id=029 bgcolor=#d6d6d6
| 38029 ||  || — || August 17, 1998 || Socorro || LINEAR || — || align=right | 9.2 km || 
|-id=030 bgcolor=#d6d6d6
| 38030 ||  || — || August 17, 1998 || Socorro || LINEAR || — || align=right | 5.8 km || 
|-id=031 bgcolor=#d6d6d6
| 38031 ||  || — || August 17, 1998 || Socorro || LINEAR || ALA || align=right | 8.9 km || 
|-id=032 bgcolor=#d6d6d6
| 38032 ||  || — || August 17, 1998 || Socorro || LINEAR || — || align=right | 6.6 km || 
|-id=033 bgcolor=#d6d6d6
| 38033 ||  || — || August 17, 1998 || Socorro || LINEAR || — || align=right | 11 km || 
|-id=034 bgcolor=#d6d6d6
| 38034 ||  || — || August 30, 1998 || Kitt Peak || Spacewatch || — || align=right | 8.4 km || 
|-id=035 bgcolor=#d6d6d6
| 38035 ||  || — || August 24, 1998 || Socorro || LINEAR || — || align=right | 11 km || 
|-id=036 bgcolor=#d6d6d6
| 38036 ||  || — || September 13, 1998 || Reedy Creek || J. Broughton || — || align=right | 9.3 km || 
|-id=037 bgcolor=#d6d6d6
| 38037 ||  || — || September 14, 1998 || Socorro || LINEAR || HYG || align=right | 6.0 km || 
|-id=038 bgcolor=#d6d6d6
| 38038 ||  || — || September 14, 1998 || Socorro || LINEAR || — || align=right | 10 km || 
|-id=039 bgcolor=#d6d6d6
| 38039 ||  || — || September 14, 1998 || Socorro || LINEAR || THM || align=right | 8.4 km || 
|-id=040 bgcolor=#d6d6d6
| 38040 ||  || — || September 14, 1998 || Socorro || LINEAR || — || align=right | 12 km || 
|-id=041 bgcolor=#d6d6d6
| 38041 ||  || — || September 14, 1998 || Socorro || LINEAR || HYG || align=right | 9.3 km || 
|-id=042 bgcolor=#d6d6d6
| 38042 ||  || — || September 21, 1998 || Catalina || CSS || PAL || align=right | 12 km || 
|-id=043 bgcolor=#E9E9E9
| 38043 ||  || — || September 22, 1998 || Anderson Mesa || LONEOS || EUN || align=right | 4.7 km || 
|-id=044 bgcolor=#fefefe
| 38044 Michaellucas ||  ||  || September 19, 1998 || Anderson Mesa || LONEOS || H || align=right | 1.6 km || 
|-id=045 bgcolor=#d6d6d6
| 38045 ||  || — || September 26, 1998 || Socorro || LINEAR || — || align=right | 11 km || 
|-id=046 bgcolor=#d6d6d6
| 38046 Krasnoyarsk ||  ||  || September 20, 1998 || La Silla || E. W. Elst || SHU3:2 || align=right | 16 km || 
|-id=047 bgcolor=#fefefe
| 38047 ||  || — || October 14, 1998 || Catalina || CSS || H || align=right | 2.1 km || 
|-id=048 bgcolor=#fefefe
| 38048 ||  || — || October 27, 1998 || Catalina || CSS || H || align=right | 1.8 km || 
|-id=049 bgcolor=#fefefe
| 38049 ||  || — || November 11, 1998 || Socorro || LINEAR || H || align=right | 1.3 km || 
|-id=050 bgcolor=#C2FFFF
| 38050 Bias ||  ||  || November 10, 1998 || Socorro || LINEAR || L4 || align=right | 62 km || 
|-id=051 bgcolor=#C2FFFF
| 38051 ||  || — || December 7, 1998 || Višnjan Observatory || K. Korlević || L4 || align=right | 22 km || 
|-id=052 bgcolor=#C2FFFF
| 38052 ||  || — || December 8, 1998 || Kitt Peak || Spacewatch || L4 || align=right | 16 km || 
|-id=053 bgcolor=#fefefe
| 38053 ||  || — || December 11, 1998 || Socorro || LINEAR || H || align=right | 1.7 km || 
|-id=054 bgcolor=#fefefe
| 38054 ||  || — || January 14, 1999 || Višnjan Observatory || K. Korlević || — || align=right | 2.9 km || 
|-id=055 bgcolor=#fefefe
| 38055 ||  || — || January 15, 1999 || Catalina || CSS || H || align=right | 1.7 km || 
|-id=056 bgcolor=#fefefe
| 38056 ||  || — || January 20, 1999 || Caussols || ODAS || — || align=right | 2.1 km || 
|-id=057 bgcolor=#E9E9E9
| 38057 ||  || — || January 26, 1999 || Višnjan Observatory || K. Korlević || — || align=right | 5.6 km || 
|-id=058 bgcolor=#fefefe
| 38058 ||  || — || February 10, 1999 || Socorro || LINEAR || FLO || align=right | 3.6 km || 
|-id=059 bgcolor=#fefefe
| 38059 ||  || — || February 10, 1999 || Socorro || LINEAR || — || align=right | 2.8 km || 
|-id=060 bgcolor=#fefefe
| 38060 ||  || — || February 12, 1999 || Socorro || LINEAR || — || align=right | 2.0 km || 
|-id=061 bgcolor=#fefefe
| 38061 ||  || — || February 17, 1999 || Socorro || LINEAR || H || align=right | 1.3 km || 
|-id=062 bgcolor=#fefefe
| 38062 ||  || — || March 15, 1999 || Kitt Peak || Spacewatch || — || align=right | 3.9 km || 
|-id=063 bgcolor=#FA8072
| 38063 || 1999 FH || — || March 16, 1999 || Višnjan Observatory || K. Korlević, M. Jurić || slow || align=right | 3.4 km || 
|-id=064 bgcolor=#fefefe
| 38064 ||  || — || March 17, 1999 || Kitt Peak || Spacewatch || FLO || align=right | 1.7 km || 
|-id=065 bgcolor=#fefefe
| 38065 ||  || — || March 22, 1999 || Anderson Mesa || LONEOS || — || align=right | 2.7 km || 
|-id=066 bgcolor=#FA8072
| 38066 ||  || — || March 22, 1999 || Anderson Mesa || LONEOS || — || align=right | 2.4 km || 
|-id=067 bgcolor=#E9E9E9
| 38067 ||  || — || March 19, 1999 || Socorro || LINEAR || EUN || align=right | 7.1 km || 
|-id=068 bgcolor=#fefefe
| 38068 ||  || — || March 19, 1999 || Socorro || LINEAR || — || align=right | 4.2 km || 
|-id=069 bgcolor=#fefefe
| 38069 || 1999 GN || — || April 5, 1999 || Višnjan Observatory || K. Korlević || — || align=right | 2.3 km || 
|-id=070 bgcolor=#fefefe
| 38070 Redwine ||  ||  || April 6, 1999 || Anderson Mesa || LONEOS || — || align=right | 2.6 km || 
|-id=071 bgcolor=#FFC2E0
| 38071 ||  || — || April 10, 1999 || Socorro || LINEAR || AMOPHAslow || align=right data-sort-value="0.45" | 450 m || 
|-id=072 bgcolor=#fefefe
| 38072 ||  || — || April 11, 1999 || Kitt Peak || Spacewatch || FLO || align=right | 1.7 km || 
|-id=073 bgcolor=#fefefe
| 38073 ||  || — || April 11, 1999 || Kitt Peak || Spacewatch || — || align=right | 2.2 km || 
|-id=074 bgcolor=#FA8072
| 38074 ||  || — || April 15, 1999 || Socorro || LINEAR || — || align=right | 2.8 km || 
|-id=075 bgcolor=#d6d6d6
| 38075 ||  || — || April 15, 1999 || Socorro || LINEAR || — || align=right | 5.0 km || 
|-id=076 bgcolor=#fefefe
| 38076 ||  || — || April 7, 1999 || Socorro || LINEAR || — || align=right | 1.9 km || 
|-id=077 bgcolor=#fefefe
| 38077 ||  || — || April 7, 1999 || Socorro || LINEAR || — || align=right | 1.7 km || 
|-id=078 bgcolor=#fefefe
| 38078 ||  || — || April 12, 1999 || Socorro || LINEAR || — || align=right | 5.7 km || 
|-id=079 bgcolor=#fefefe
| 38079 || 1999 HF || — || April 16, 1999 || Xinglong || SCAP || PHOmoon || align=right | 3.4 km || 
|-id=080 bgcolor=#fefefe
| 38080 ||  || — || April 17, 1999 || Socorro || LINEAR || FLO || align=right | 1.9 km || 
|-id=081 bgcolor=#E9E9E9
| 38081 ||  || — || April 17, 1999 || Socorro || LINEAR || — || align=right | 2.8 km || 
|-id=082 bgcolor=#fefefe
| 38082 ||  || — || April 17, 1999 || Catalina || CSS || — || align=right | 1.6 km || 
|-id=083 bgcolor=#C2E0FF
| 38083 Rhadamanthus ||  ||  || April 17, 1999 || Kitt Peak || DES || other TNO || align=right | 176 km || 
|-id=084 bgcolor=#C2E0FF
| 38084 ||  || — || April 18, 1999 || Kitt Peak || M. W. Buie, R. Millis || res2:5critical || align=right | 170 km || 
|-id=085 bgcolor=#fefefe
| 38085 ||  || — || April 17, 1999 || Socorro || LINEAR || PHO || align=right | 2.3 km || 
|-id=086 bgcolor=#FFC2E0
| 38086 Beowulf || 1999 JB ||  || May 5, 1999 || Anderson Mesa || LONEOS || APO +1km || align=right data-sort-value="0.64" | 640 m || 
|-id=087 bgcolor=#fefefe
| 38087 || 1999 JN || — || May 6, 1999 || Gekko || T. Kagawa || — || align=right | 3.6 km || 
|-id=088 bgcolor=#fefefe
| 38088 ||  || — || May 8, 1999 || Catalina || CSS || — || align=right | 5.9 km || 
|-id=089 bgcolor=#E9E9E9
| 38089 ||  || — || May 8, 1999 || Catalina || CSS || EUN || align=right | 5.2 km || 
|-id=090 bgcolor=#fefefe
| 38090 ||  || — || May 8, 1999 || Catalina || CSS || FLO || align=right | 2.3 km || 
|-id=091 bgcolor=#FFC2E0
| 38091 ||  || — || May 10, 1999 || Anderson Mesa || LONEOS || AMO +1km || align=right | 2.5 km || 
|-id=092 bgcolor=#fefefe
| 38092 ||  || — || May 10, 1999 || Socorro || LINEAR || — || align=right | 1.8 km || 
|-id=093 bgcolor=#fefefe
| 38093 ||  || — || May 8, 1999 || Catalina || CSS || V || align=right | 1.9 km || 
|-id=094 bgcolor=#fefefe
| 38094 ||  || — || May 8, 1999 || Catalina || CSS || — || align=right | 1.8 km || 
|-id=095 bgcolor=#fefefe
| 38095 ||  || — || May 8, 1999 || Catalina || CSS || — || align=right | 2.4 km || 
|-id=096 bgcolor=#fefefe
| 38096 ||  || — || May 9, 1999 || Višnjan Observatory || K. Korlević || MAS || align=right | 2.2 km || 
|-id=097 bgcolor=#fefefe
| 38097 ||  || — || May 12, 1999 || Socorro || LINEAR || PHO || align=right | 2.6 km || 
|-id=098 bgcolor=#fefefe
| 38098 ||  || — || May 10, 1999 || Socorro || LINEAR || — || align=right | 2.6 km || 
|-id=099 bgcolor=#fefefe
| 38099 ||  || — || May 13, 1999 || Socorro || LINEAR || V || align=right | 1.8 km || 
|-id=100 bgcolor=#fefefe
| 38100 ||  || — || May 15, 1999 || Socorro || LINEAR || — || align=right | 1.4 km || 
|}

38101–38200 

|-bgcolor=#fefefe
| 38101 ||  || — || May 15, 1999 || Catalina || CSS || FLO || align=right | 1.4 km || 
|-id=102 bgcolor=#fefefe
| 38102 ||  || — || May 10, 1999 || Socorro || LINEAR || FLO || align=right | 1.7 km || 
|-id=103 bgcolor=#fefefe
| 38103 ||  || — || May 10, 1999 || Socorro || LINEAR || — || align=right | 3.2 km || 
|-id=104 bgcolor=#fefefe
| 38104 ||  || — || May 10, 1999 || Socorro || LINEAR || — || align=right | 1.8 km || 
|-id=105 bgcolor=#fefefe
| 38105 ||  || — || May 10, 1999 || Socorro || LINEAR || FLO || align=right | 2.0 km || 
|-id=106 bgcolor=#fefefe
| 38106 ||  || — || May 10, 1999 || Socorro || LINEAR || ERI || align=right | 4.1 km || 
|-id=107 bgcolor=#fefefe
| 38107 ||  || — || May 10, 1999 || Socorro || LINEAR || — || align=right | 1.7 km || 
|-id=108 bgcolor=#fefefe
| 38108 ||  || — || May 10, 1999 || Socorro || LINEAR || — || align=right | 2.6 km || 
|-id=109 bgcolor=#fefefe
| 38109 ||  || — || May 10, 1999 || Socorro || LINEAR || — || align=right | 3.0 km || 
|-id=110 bgcolor=#fefefe
| 38110 ||  || — || May 10, 1999 || Socorro || LINEAR || V || align=right | 2.3 km || 
|-id=111 bgcolor=#fefefe
| 38111 ||  || — || May 10, 1999 || Socorro || LINEAR || — || align=right | 1.8 km || 
|-id=112 bgcolor=#fefefe
| 38112 ||  || — || May 10, 1999 || Socorro || LINEAR || — || align=right | 4.0 km || 
|-id=113 bgcolor=#fefefe
| 38113 ||  || — || May 10, 1999 || Socorro || LINEAR || V || align=right | 1.6 km || 
|-id=114 bgcolor=#fefefe
| 38114 ||  || — || May 10, 1999 || Socorro || LINEAR || — || align=right | 1.8 km || 
|-id=115 bgcolor=#fefefe
| 38115 ||  || — || May 10, 1999 || Socorro || LINEAR || — || align=right | 1.6 km || 
|-id=116 bgcolor=#fefefe
| 38116 ||  || — || May 10, 1999 || Socorro || LINEAR || — || align=right | 2.4 km || 
|-id=117 bgcolor=#E9E9E9
| 38117 ||  || — || May 10, 1999 || Socorro || LINEAR || — || align=right | 6.7 km || 
|-id=118 bgcolor=#fefefe
| 38118 ||  || — || May 10, 1999 || Socorro || LINEAR || — || align=right | 2.4 km || 
|-id=119 bgcolor=#fefefe
| 38119 ||  || — || May 10, 1999 || Socorro || LINEAR || V || align=right | 3.8 km || 
|-id=120 bgcolor=#fefefe
| 38120 ||  || — || May 10, 1999 || Socorro || LINEAR || NYS || align=right | 4.7 km || 
|-id=121 bgcolor=#fefefe
| 38121 ||  || — || May 10, 1999 || Socorro || LINEAR || — || align=right | 2.5 km || 
|-id=122 bgcolor=#fefefe
| 38122 ||  || — || May 10, 1999 || Socorro || LINEAR || — || align=right | 2.3 km || 
|-id=123 bgcolor=#fefefe
| 38123 ||  || — || May 10, 1999 || Socorro || LINEAR || — || align=right | 2.3 km || 
|-id=124 bgcolor=#fefefe
| 38124 ||  || — || May 10, 1999 || Socorro || LINEAR || FLO || align=right | 1.8 km || 
|-id=125 bgcolor=#fefefe
| 38125 ||  || — || May 10, 1999 || Socorro || LINEAR || — || align=right | 5.6 km || 
|-id=126 bgcolor=#fefefe
| 38126 ||  || — || May 10, 1999 || Socorro || LINEAR || — || align=right | 3.0 km || 
|-id=127 bgcolor=#fefefe
| 38127 ||  || — || May 10, 1999 || Socorro || LINEAR || — || align=right | 2.5 km || 
|-id=128 bgcolor=#fefefe
| 38128 ||  || — || May 10, 1999 || Socorro || LINEAR || FLO || align=right | 2.2 km || 
|-id=129 bgcolor=#fefefe
| 38129 ||  || — || May 10, 1999 || Socorro || LINEAR || — || align=right | 2.4 km || 
|-id=130 bgcolor=#E9E9E9
| 38130 ||  || — || May 10, 1999 || Socorro || LINEAR || — || align=right | 2.5 km || 
|-id=131 bgcolor=#fefefe
| 38131 ||  || — || May 10, 1999 || Socorro || LINEAR || NYS || align=right | 2.2 km || 
|-id=132 bgcolor=#fefefe
| 38132 ||  || — || May 10, 1999 || Socorro || LINEAR || — || align=right | 2.0 km || 
|-id=133 bgcolor=#fefefe
| 38133 ||  || — || May 10, 1999 || Socorro || LINEAR || FLO || align=right | 1.3 km || 
|-id=134 bgcolor=#fefefe
| 38134 ||  || — || May 10, 1999 || Socorro || LINEAR || — || align=right | 3.2 km || 
|-id=135 bgcolor=#fefefe
| 38135 ||  || — || May 10, 1999 || Socorro || LINEAR || FLO || align=right | 1.9 km || 
|-id=136 bgcolor=#fefefe
| 38136 ||  || — || May 10, 1999 || Socorro || LINEAR || FLO || align=right | 2.6 km || 
|-id=137 bgcolor=#fefefe
| 38137 ||  || — || May 10, 1999 || Socorro || LINEAR || FLO || align=right | 1.4 km || 
|-id=138 bgcolor=#fefefe
| 38138 ||  || — || May 10, 1999 || Socorro || LINEAR || MAS || align=right | 1.8 km || 
|-id=139 bgcolor=#fefefe
| 38139 ||  || — || May 10, 1999 || Socorro || LINEAR || NYS || align=right | 2.8 km || 
|-id=140 bgcolor=#fefefe
| 38140 ||  || — || May 10, 1999 || Socorro || LINEAR || V || align=right | 1.8 km || 
|-id=141 bgcolor=#fefefe
| 38141 ||  || — || May 10, 1999 || Socorro || LINEAR || FLO || align=right | 2.8 km || 
|-id=142 bgcolor=#fefefe
| 38142 ||  || — || May 10, 1999 || Socorro || LINEAR || FLO || align=right | 2.1 km || 
|-id=143 bgcolor=#fefefe
| 38143 ||  || — || May 10, 1999 || Socorro || LINEAR || — || align=right | 2.2 km || 
|-id=144 bgcolor=#E9E9E9
| 38144 ||  || — || May 10, 1999 || Socorro || LINEAR || — || align=right | 5.3 km || 
|-id=145 bgcolor=#fefefe
| 38145 ||  || — || May 10, 1999 || Socorro || LINEAR || V || align=right | 2.1 km || 
|-id=146 bgcolor=#fefefe
| 38146 ||  || — || May 10, 1999 || Socorro || LINEAR || V || align=right | 2.3 km || 
|-id=147 bgcolor=#fefefe
| 38147 ||  || — || May 10, 1999 || Socorro || LINEAR || V || align=right | 2.0 km || 
|-id=148 bgcolor=#fefefe
| 38148 ||  || — || May 10, 1999 || Socorro || LINEAR || — || align=right | 1.9 km || 
|-id=149 bgcolor=#fefefe
| 38149 ||  || — || May 10, 1999 || Socorro || LINEAR || FLO || align=right | 3.1 km || 
|-id=150 bgcolor=#fefefe
| 38150 ||  || — || May 10, 1999 || Socorro || LINEAR || FLO || align=right | 2.3 km || 
|-id=151 bgcolor=#fefefe
| 38151 ||  || — || May 12, 1999 || Socorro || LINEAR || — || align=right | 2.0 km || 
|-id=152 bgcolor=#fefefe
| 38152 ||  || — || May 12, 1999 || Socorro || LINEAR || FLO || align=right | 2.5 km || 
|-id=153 bgcolor=#fefefe
| 38153 ||  || — || May 12, 1999 || Socorro || LINEAR || FLO || align=right | 1.8 km || 
|-id=154 bgcolor=#fefefe
| 38154 ||  || — || May 12, 1999 || Socorro || LINEAR || — || align=right | 2.0 km || 
|-id=155 bgcolor=#fefefe
| 38155 ||  || — || May 12, 1999 || Socorro || LINEAR || — || align=right | 2.4 km || 
|-id=156 bgcolor=#fefefe
| 38156 ||  || — || May 12, 1999 || Socorro || LINEAR || FLO || align=right | 2.7 km || 
|-id=157 bgcolor=#fefefe
| 38157 ||  || — || May 12, 1999 || Socorro || LINEAR || FLO || align=right | 2.1 km || 
|-id=158 bgcolor=#fefefe
| 38158 ||  || — || May 12, 1999 || Socorro || LINEAR || NYS || align=right | 1.9 km || 
|-id=159 bgcolor=#fefefe
| 38159 ||  || — || May 12, 1999 || Socorro || LINEAR || V || align=right | 1.7 km || 
|-id=160 bgcolor=#fefefe
| 38160 ||  || — || May 12, 1999 || Socorro || LINEAR || — || align=right | 2.1 km || 
|-id=161 bgcolor=#fefefe
| 38161 ||  || — || May 12, 1999 || Socorro || LINEAR || — || align=right | 2.2 km || 
|-id=162 bgcolor=#fefefe
| 38162 ||  || — || May 12, 1999 || Socorro || LINEAR || — || align=right | 3.1 km || 
|-id=163 bgcolor=#fefefe
| 38163 ||  || — || May 12, 1999 || Socorro || LINEAR || — || align=right | 2.7 km || 
|-id=164 bgcolor=#fefefe
| 38164 ||  || — || May 12, 1999 || Socorro || LINEAR || — || align=right | 2.9 km || 
|-id=165 bgcolor=#fefefe
| 38165 ||  || — || May 12, 1999 || Socorro || LINEAR || — || align=right | 2.3 km || 
|-id=166 bgcolor=#fefefe
| 38166 ||  || — || May 13, 1999 || Socorro || LINEAR || — || align=right | 6.1 km || 
|-id=167 bgcolor=#fefefe
| 38167 ||  || — || May 12, 1999 || Socorro || LINEAR || — || align=right | 1.7 km || 
|-id=168 bgcolor=#fefefe
| 38168 ||  || — || May 12, 1999 || Socorro || LINEAR || FLO || align=right | 2.8 km || 
|-id=169 bgcolor=#E9E9E9
| 38169 ||  || — || May 12, 1999 || Socorro || LINEAR || — || align=right | 2.4 km || 
|-id=170 bgcolor=#E9E9E9
| 38170 ||  || — || May 12, 1999 || Socorro || LINEAR || — || align=right | 7.8 km || 
|-id=171 bgcolor=#fefefe
| 38171 ||  || — || May 13, 1999 || Socorro || LINEAR || — || align=right | 1.9 km || 
|-id=172 bgcolor=#fefefe
| 38172 ||  || — || May 13, 1999 || Socorro || LINEAR || — || align=right | 2.3 km || 
|-id=173 bgcolor=#fefefe
| 38173 ||  || — || May 13, 1999 || Socorro || LINEAR || ERI || align=right | 3.6 km || 
|-id=174 bgcolor=#E9E9E9
| 38174 ||  || — || May 13, 1999 || Socorro || LINEAR || — || align=right | 3.2 km || 
|-id=175 bgcolor=#fefefe
| 38175 ||  || — || May 13, 1999 || Socorro || LINEAR || NYS || align=right | 1.4 km || 
|-id=176 bgcolor=#fefefe
| 38176 ||  || — || May 13, 1999 || Socorro || LINEAR || NYS || align=right | 2.4 km || 
|-id=177 bgcolor=#E9E9E9
| 38177 ||  || — || May 13, 1999 || Socorro || LINEAR || — || align=right | 2.8 km || 
|-id=178 bgcolor=#E9E9E9
| 38178 ||  || — || May 13, 1999 || Socorro || LINEAR || — || align=right | 2.5 km || 
|-id=179 bgcolor=#fefefe
| 38179 ||  || — || May 13, 1999 || Socorro || LINEAR || NYS || align=right | 3.1 km || 
|-id=180 bgcolor=#fefefe
| 38180 ||  || — || May 13, 1999 || Socorro || LINEAR || FLO || align=right | 1.9 km || 
|-id=181 bgcolor=#FA8072
| 38181 ||  || — || May 15, 1999 || Socorro || LINEAR || PHO || align=right | 3.4 km || 
|-id=182 bgcolor=#fefefe
| 38182 ||  || — || May 10, 1999 || Socorro || LINEAR || — || align=right | 1.3 km || 
|-id=183 bgcolor=#fefefe
| 38183 ||  || — || May 10, 1999 || Socorro || LINEAR || NYS || align=right | 2.4 km || 
|-id=184 bgcolor=#fefefe
| 38184 || 1999 KF || — || May 16, 1999 || Kitt Peak || Spacewatch || EUT || align=right | 1.9 km || 
|-id=185 bgcolor=#fefefe
| 38185 || 1999 KJ || — || May 16, 1999 || Kitt Peak || Spacewatch || — || align=right | 1.6 km || 
|-id=186 bgcolor=#fefefe
| 38186 || 1999 KV || — || May 17, 1999 || Catalina || CSS || NYS || align=right | 2.0 km || 
|-id=187 bgcolor=#fefefe
| 38187 ||  || — || May 17, 1999 || Socorro || LINEAR || V || align=right | 2.1 km || 
|-id=188 bgcolor=#fefefe
| 38188 ||  || — || May 18, 1999 || Socorro || LINEAR || — || align=right | 2.0 km || 
|-id=189 bgcolor=#fefefe
| 38189 ||  || — || May 18, 1999 || Socorro || LINEAR || — || align=right | 3.1 km || 
|-id=190 bgcolor=#fefefe
| 38190 ||  || — || May 18, 1999 || Socorro || LINEAR || — || align=right | 2.0 km || 
|-id=191 bgcolor=#fefefe
| 38191 ||  || — || May 18, 1999 || Socorro || LINEAR || — || align=right | 2.1 km || 
|-id=192 bgcolor=#E9E9E9
| 38192 ||  || — || June 7, 1999 || Kitt Peak || Spacewatch || — || align=right | 5.6 km || 
|-id=193 bgcolor=#fefefe
| 38193 ||  || — || June 8, 1999 || Socorro || LINEAR || FLO || align=right | 1.8 km || 
|-id=194 bgcolor=#fefefe
| 38194 ||  || — || June 9, 1999 || Socorro || LINEAR || — || align=right | 1.9 km || 
|-id=195 bgcolor=#E9E9E9
| 38195 ||  || — || June 9, 1999 || Socorro || LINEAR || RAF || align=right | 2.8 km || 
|-id=196 bgcolor=#fefefe
| 38196 ||  || — || June 12, 1999 || Socorro || LINEAR || — || align=right | 3.1 km || 
|-id=197 bgcolor=#E9E9E9
| 38197 ||  || — || June 9, 1999 || Socorro || LINEAR || — || align=right | 3.2 km || 
|-id=198 bgcolor=#fefefe
| 38198 ||  || — || June 9, 1999 || Socorro || LINEAR || NYS || align=right | 4.8 km || 
|-id=199 bgcolor=#E9E9E9
| 38199 ||  || — || June 9, 1999 || Socorro || LINEAR || — || align=right | 4.4 km || 
|-id=200 bgcolor=#fefefe
| 38200 ||  || — || June 9, 1999 || Socorro || LINEAR || V || align=right | 2.0 km || 
|}

38201–38300 

|-bgcolor=#E9E9E9
| 38201 ||  || — || June 9, 1999 || Socorro || LINEAR || — || align=right | 3.0 km || 
|-id=202 bgcolor=#fefefe
| 38202 ||  || — || June 10, 1999 || Palomar || NEAT || FLO || align=right | 2.4 km || 
|-id=203 bgcolor=#E9E9E9
| 38203 Sanner || 1999 MJ ||  || June 19, 1999 || Junk Bond || J. Medkeff, D. Healy || — || align=right | 3.8 km || 
|-id=204 bgcolor=#fefefe
| 38204 || 1999 MT || — || June 16, 1999 || Višnjan Observatory || K. Korlević || — || align=right | 3.0 km || 
|-id=205 bgcolor=#E9E9E9
| 38205 ||  || — || June 20, 1999 || Anderson Mesa || LONEOS || EUN || align=right | 4.1 km || 
|-id=206 bgcolor=#E9E9E9
| 38206 ||  || — || June 20, 1999 || Anderson Mesa || LONEOS || — || align=right | 5.3 km || 
|-id=207 bgcolor=#fefefe
| 38207 ||  || — || June 20, 1999 || Anderson Mesa || LONEOS || MAS || align=right | 3.1 km || 
|-id=208 bgcolor=#E9E9E9
| 38208 ||  || — || June 20, 1999 || Anderson Mesa || LONEOS || — || align=right | 4.6 km || 
|-id=209 bgcolor=#E9E9E9
| 38209 || 1999 NE || — || July 4, 1999 || Woomera || F. B. Zoltowski || — || align=right | 4.0 km || 
|-id=210 bgcolor=#fefefe
| 38210 ||  || — || July 13, 1999 || Reedy Creek || J. Broughton || — || align=right | 2.0 km || 
|-id=211 bgcolor=#E9E9E9
| 38211 ||  || — || July 12, 1999 || Višnjan Observatory || K. Korlević || MIS || align=right | 6.4 km || 
|-id=212 bgcolor=#fefefe
| 38212 ||  || — || July 13, 1999 || Socorro || LINEAR || — || align=right | 2.6 km || 
|-id=213 bgcolor=#E9E9E9
| 38213 ||  || — || July 13, 1999 || Socorro || LINEAR || — || align=right | 5.5 km || 
|-id=214 bgcolor=#fefefe
| 38214 ||  || — || July 13, 1999 || Socorro || LINEAR || — || align=right | 2.1 km || 
|-id=215 bgcolor=#d6d6d6
| 38215 ||  || — || July 13, 1999 || Socorro || LINEAR || BRA || align=right | 3.7 km || 
|-id=216 bgcolor=#fefefe
| 38216 ||  || — || July 13, 1999 || Socorro || LINEAR || — || align=right | 2.2 km || 
|-id=217 bgcolor=#E9E9E9
| 38217 ||  || — || July 13, 1999 || Socorro || LINEAR || — || align=right | 4.7 km || 
|-id=218 bgcolor=#fefefe
| 38218 ||  || — || July 14, 1999 || Socorro || LINEAR || — || align=right | 5.0 km || 
|-id=219 bgcolor=#E9E9E9
| 38219 ||  || — || July 14, 1999 || Socorro || LINEAR || GER || align=right | 4.4 km || 
|-id=220 bgcolor=#fefefe
| 38220 ||  || — || July 14, 1999 || Socorro || LINEAR || — || align=right | 2.7 km || 
|-id=221 bgcolor=#E9E9E9
| 38221 ||  || — || July 14, 1999 || Socorro || LINEAR || — || align=right | 4.0 km || 
|-id=222 bgcolor=#E9E9E9
| 38222 ||  || — || July 14, 1999 || Socorro || LINEAR || — || align=right | 3.1 km || 
|-id=223 bgcolor=#fefefe
| 38223 ||  || — || July 14, 1999 || Socorro || LINEAR || FLO || align=right | 2.6 km || 
|-id=224 bgcolor=#E9E9E9
| 38224 ||  || — || July 14, 1999 || Socorro || LINEAR || — || align=right | 2.8 km || 
|-id=225 bgcolor=#fefefe
| 38225 ||  || — || July 13, 1999 || Socorro || LINEAR || — || align=right | 4.7 km || 
|-id=226 bgcolor=#E9E9E9
| 38226 ||  || — || July 13, 1999 || Socorro || LINEAR || EUN || align=right | 4.0 km || 
|-id=227 bgcolor=#E9E9E9
| 38227 ||  || — || July 13, 1999 || Socorro || LINEAR || EUN || align=right | 3.6 km || 
|-id=228 bgcolor=#E9E9E9
| 38228 ||  || — || July 12, 1999 || Socorro || LINEAR || EUN || align=right | 3.0 km || 
|-id=229 bgcolor=#E9E9E9
| 38229 ||  || — || July 12, 1999 || Socorro || LINEAR || EUN || align=right | 4.7 km || 
|-id=230 bgcolor=#E9E9E9
| 38230 ||  || — || July 12, 1999 || Socorro || LINEAR || — || align=right | 3.9 km || 
|-id=231 bgcolor=#d6d6d6
| 38231 ||  || — || July 12, 1999 || Socorro || LINEAR || — || align=right | 11 km || 
|-id=232 bgcolor=#E9E9E9
| 38232 ||  || — || July 12, 1999 || Socorro || LINEAR || — || align=right | 4.0 km || 
|-id=233 bgcolor=#fefefe
| 38233 ||  || — || July 13, 1999 || Socorro || LINEAR || — || align=right | 4.3 km || 
|-id=234 bgcolor=#E9E9E9
| 38234 ||  || — || July 13, 1999 || Socorro || LINEAR || — || align=right | 7.7 km || 
|-id=235 bgcolor=#fefefe
| 38235 ||  || — || July 14, 1999 || Socorro || LINEAR || — || align=right | 3.2 km || 
|-id=236 bgcolor=#fefefe
| 38236 ||  || — || July 14, 1999 || Socorro || LINEAR || V || align=right | 2.0 km || 
|-id=237 bgcolor=#fefefe
| 38237 Roche || 1999 OF ||  || July 16, 1999 || Pises || Pises Obs. || NYS || align=right | 1.8 km || 
|-id=238 bgcolor=#E9E9E9
| 38238 Holíč || 1999 OW ||  || July 18, 1999 || Modra || Š. Gajdoš, D. Kalmančok || — || align=right | 2.9 km || 
|-id=239 bgcolor=#FFC2E0
| 38239 ||  || — || July 27, 1999 || Socorro || LINEAR || APO +1km || align=right data-sort-value="0.81" | 810 m || 
|-id=240 bgcolor=#E9E9E9
| 38240 ||  || — || August 8, 1999 || Ondřejov || L. Kotková || — || align=right | 2.1 km || 
|-id=241 bgcolor=#d6d6d6
| 38241 ||  || — || August 9, 1999 || Reedy Creek || J. Broughton || — || align=right | 5.5 km || 
|-id=242 bgcolor=#E9E9E9
| 38242 ||  || — || August 10, 1999 || Reedy Creek || J. Broughton || — || align=right | 3.4 km || 
|-id=243 bgcolor=#d6d6d6
| 38243 ||  || — || August 13, 1999 || Reedy Creek || J. Broughton || THM || align=right | 6.5 km || 
|-id=244 bgcolor=#E9E9E9
| 38244 ||  || — || August 13, 1999 || Reedy Creek || J. Broughton || HOF || align=right | 8.3 km || 
|-id=245 bgcolor=#d6d6d6
| 38245 Marcospontes ||  ||  || August 12, 1999 || Wykrota || C. Jacques, L. Duczmal || KOR || align=right | 3.5 km || 
|-id=246 bgcolor=#E9E9E9
| 38246 Palupín ||  ||  || August 14, 1999 || Kleť || J. Tichá, M. Tichý || — || align=right | 3.5 km || 
|-id=247 bgcolor=#fefefe
| 38247 || 1999 QE || — || August 18, 1999 || Monte Agliale || S. Donati || — || align=right | 2.5 km || 
|-id=248 bgcolor=#E9E9E9
| 38248 || 1999 QX || — || August 17, 1999 || Kitt Peak || Spacewatch || MRX || align=right | 2.6 km || 
|-id=249 bgcolor=#E9E9E9
| 38249 ||  || — || August 24, 1999 || Farpoint || G. Bell || — || align=right | 4.6 km || 
|-id=250 bgcolor=#d6d6d6
| 38250 Tartois ||  ||  || August 31, 1999 || Blauvac || R. Roy || THM || align=right | 6.2 km || 
|-id=251 bgcolor=#E9E9E9
| 38251 || 1999 RY || — || September 4, 1999 || Catalina || CSS || — || align=right | 2.6 km || 
|-id=252 bgcolor=#d6d6d6
| 38252 ||  || — || September 3, 1999 || Kitt Peak || Spacewatch || THM || align=right | 5.6 km || 
|-id=253 bgcolor=#d6d6d6
| 38253 ||  || — || September 4, 1999 || Kitt Peak || Spacewatch || KOR || align=right | 3.9 km || 
|-id=254 bgcolor=#E9E9E9
| 38254 ||  || — || September 6, 1999 || Kitt Peak || Spacewatch || — || align=right | 3.5 km || 
|-id=255 bgcolor=#E9E9E9
| 38255 ||  || — || September 7, 1999 || Socorro || LINEAR || — || align=right | 3.0 km || 
|-id=256 bgcolor=#E9E9E9
| 38256 ||  || — || September 7, 1999 || Socorro || LINEAR || — || align=right | 3.2 km || 
|-id=257 bgcolor=#C2FFFF
| 38257 ||  || — || September 7, 1999 || Socorro || LINEAR || L5 || align=right | 17 km || 
|-id=258 bgcolor=#d6d6d6
| 38258 ||  || — || September 7, 1999 || Socorro || LINEAR || — || align=right | 3.9 km || 
|-id=259 bgcolor=#d6d6d6
| 38259 ||  || — || September 7, 1999 || Socorro || LINEAR || — || align=right | 12 km || 
|-id=260 bgcolor=#E9E9E9
| 38260 ||  || — || September 7, 1999 || Socorro || LINEAR || — || align=right | 5.8 km || 
|-id=261 bgcolor=#d6d6d6
| 38261 ||  || — || September 7, 1999 || Socorro || LINEAR || — || align=right | 9.4 km || 
|-id=262 bgcolor=#d6d6d6
| 38262 ||  || — || September 7, 1999 || Socorro || LINEAR || HYG || align=right | 3.8 km || 
|-id=263 bgcolor=#d6d6d6
| 38263 ||  || — || September 7, 1999 || Socorro || LINEAR || — || align=right | 10 km || 
|-id=264 bgcolor=#E9E9E9
| 38264 ||  || — || September 7, 1999 || Socorro || LINEAR || — || align=right | 13 km || 
|-id=265 bgcolor=#d6d6d6
| 38265 ||  || — || September 7, 1999 || Socorro || LINEAR || VER || align=right | 7.9 km || 
|-id=266 bgcolor=#d6d6d6
| 38266 ||  || — || September 7, 1999 || Socorro || LINEAR || KOR || align=right | 6.0 km || 
|-id=267 bgcolor=#d6d6d6
| 38267 ||  || — || September 7, 1999 || Socorro || LINEAR || KOR || align=right | 4.5 km || 
|-id=268 bgcolor=#E9E9E9
| 38268 Zenkert ||  ||  || September 9, 1999 || Drebach || A. Knöfel || NEM || align=right | 4.7 km || 
|-id=269 bgcolor=#d6d6d6
| 38269 Gueymard ||  ||  || September 10, 1999 || Needville || W. G. Dillon, K. Rivich || — || align=right | 5.6 km || 
|-id=270 bgcolor=#E9E9E9
| 38270 Wettzell ||  ||  || September 11, 1999 || Starkenburg Observatory || Starkenburg Obs. || — || align=right | 2.9 km || 
|-id=271 bgcolor=#d6d6d6
| 38271 ||  || — || September 12, 1999 || Ondřejov || M. Wolf, P. Pravec || — || align=right | 5.3 km || 
|-id=272 bgcolor=#d6d6d6
| 38272 ||  || — || September 13, 1999 || Višnjan Observatory || K. Korlević || KOR || align=right | 5.6 km || 
|-id=273 bgcolor=#d6d6d6
| 38273 ||  || — || September 14, 1999 || Višnjan Observatory || K. Korlević || — || align=right | 8.0 km || 
|-id=274 bgcolor=#d6d6d6
| 38274 ||  || — || September 14, 1999 || Višnjan Observatory || K. Korlević || — || align=right | 4.8 km || 
|-id=275 bgcolor=#E9E9E9
| 38275 ||  || — || September 7, 1999 || Socorro || LINEAR || — || align=right | 2.5 km || 
|-id=276 bgcolor=#d6d6d6
| 38276 ||  || — || September 7, 1999 || Socorro || LINEAR || ALA || align=right | 12 km || 
|-id=277 bgcolor=#d6d6d6
| 38277 ||  || — || September 7, 1999 || Socorro || LINEAR || — || align=right | 3.5 km || 
|-id=278 bgcolor=#fefefe
| 38278 ||  || — || September 7, 1999 || Socorro || LINEAR || — || align=right | 2.0 km || 
|-id=279 bgcolor=#E9E9E9
| 38279 ||  || — || September 7, 1999 || Socorro || LINEAR || — || align=right | 2.6 km || 
|-id=280 bgcolor=#E9E9E9
| 38280 ||  || — || September 7, 1999 || Socorro || LINEAR || RAF || align=right | 2.6 km || 
|-id=281 bgcolor=#E9E9E9
| 38281 ||  || — || September 7, 1999 || Socorro || LINEAR || EUN || align=right | 3.8 km || 
|-id=282 bgcolor=#E9E9E9
| 38282 ||  || — || September 7, 1999 || Socorro || LINEAR || — || align=right | 3.3 km || 
|-id=283 bgcolor=#E9E9E9
| 38283 ||  || — || September 7, 1999 || Socorro || LINEAR || — || align=right | 5.9 km || 
|-id=284 bgcolor=#E9E9E9
| 38284 ||  || — || September 7, 1999 || Socorro || LINEAR || — || align=right | 4.9 km || 
|-id=285 bgcolor=#d6d6d6
| 38285 ||  || — || September 7, 1999 || Socorro || LINEAR || KOR || align=right | 3.6 km || 
|-id=286 bgcolor=#fefefe
| 38286 ||  || — || September 7, 1999 || Socorro || LINEAR || MAS || align=right | 2.2 km || 
|-id=287 bgcolor=#E9E9E9
| 38287 ||  || — || September 7, 1999 || Socorro || LINEAR || PAD || align=right | 7.4 km || 
|-id=288 bgcolor=#d6d6d6
| 38288 ||  || — || September 7, 1999 || Socorro || LINEAR || — || align=right | 6.5 km || 
|-id=289 bgcolor=#E9E9E9
| 38289 ||  || — || September 7, 1999 || Socorro || LINEAR || — || align=right | 4.7 km || 
|-id=290 bgcolor=#d6d6d6
| 38290 ||  || — || September 7, 1999 || Socorro || LINEAR || EOS || align=right | 5.1 km || 
|-id=291 bgcolor=#d6d6d6
| 38291 ||  || — || September 7, 1999 || Socorro || LINEAR || — || align=right | 8.2 km || 
|-id=292 bgcolor=#d6d6d6
| 38292 ||  || — || September 7, 1999 || Socorro || LINEAR || 3:2 || align=right | 11 km || 
|-id=293 bgcolor=#d6d6d6
| 38293 ||  || — || September 7, 1999 || Socorro || LINEAR || — || align=right | 6.3 km || 
|-id=294 bgcolor=#d6d6d6
| 38294 ||  || — || September 7, 1999 || Socorro || LINEAR || KOR || align=right | 5.3 km || 
|-id=295 bgcolor=#d6d6d6
| 38295 ||  || — || September 7, 1999 || Socorro || LINEAR || KOR || align=right | 4.8 km || 
|-id=296 bgcolor=#d6d6d6
| 38296 ||  || — || September 7, 1999 || Socorro || LINEAR || — || align=right | 4.2 km || 
|-id=297 bgcolor=#d6d6d6
| 38297 ||  || — || September 7, 1999 || Socorro || LINEAR || — || align=right | 3.0 km || 
|-id=298 bgcolor=#E9E9E9
| 38298 ||  || — || September 7, 1999 || Socorro || LINEAR || — || align=right | 3.4 km || 
|-id=299 bgcolor=#d6d6d6
| 38299 ||  || — || September 7, 1999 || Socorro || LINEAR || KOR || align=right | 4.7 km || 
|-id=300 bgcolor=#d6d6d6
| 38300 ||  || — || September 7, 1999 || Socorro || LINEAR || TEL || align=right | 4.3 km || 
|}

38301–38400 

|-bgcolor=#d6d6d6
| 38301 ||  || — || September 7, 1999 || Socorro || LINEAR || — || align=right | 9.3 km || 
|-id=302 bgcolor=#d6d6d6
| 38302 ||  || — || September 7, 1999 || Socorro || LINEAR || KOR || align=right | 3.8 km || 
|-id=303 bgcolor=#d6d6d6
| 38303 ||  || — || September 7, 1999 || Socorro || LINEAR || — || align=right | 7.5 km || 
|-id=304 bgcolor=#d6d6d6
| 38304 ||  || — || September 7, 1999 || Socorro || LINEAR || KOR || align=right | 4.4 km || 
|-id=305 bgcolor=#d6d6d6
| 38305 ||  || — || September 7, 1999 || Socorro || LINEAR || THM || align=right | 9.8 km || 
|-id=306 bgcolor=#d6d6d6
| 38306 ||  || — || September 7, 1999 || Socorro || LINEAR || — || align=right | 9.4 km || 
|-id=307 bgcolor=#fefefe
| 38307 ||  || — || September 8, 1999 || Socorro || LINEAR || — || align=right | 2.7 km || 
|-id=308 bgcolor=#E9E9E9
| 38308 ||  || — || September 8, 1999 || Socorro || LINEAR || — || align=right | 6.8 km || 
|-id=309 bgcolor=#d6d6d6
| 38309 ||  || — || September 8, 1999 || Socorro || LINEAR || SAN || align=right | 4.1 km || 
|-id=310 bgcolor=#E9E9E9
| 38310 ||  || — || September 8, 1999 || Socorro || LINEAR || — || align=right | 4.7 km || 
|-id=311 bgcolor=#d6d6d6
| 38311 ||  || — || September 8, 1999 || Socorro || LINEAR || URS || align=right | 4.1 km || 
|-id=312 bgcolor=#d6d6d6
| 38312 ||  || — || September 8, 1999 || Socorro || LINEAR || VER || align=right | 9.6 km || 
|-id=313 bgcolor=#d6d6d6
| 38313 ||  || — || September 9, 1999 || Socorro || LINEAR || — || align=right | 4.6 km || 
|-id=314 bgcolor=#fefefe
| 38314 ||  || — || September 9, 1999 || Socorro || LINEAR || — || align=right | 2.8 km || 
|-id=315 bgcolor=#d6d6d6
| 38315 ||  || — || September 9, 1999 || Socorro || LINEAR || LIX || align=right | 8.2 km || 
|-id=316 bgcolor=#E9E9E9
| 38316 ||  || — || September 9, 1999 || Socorro || LINEAR || — || align=right | 2.8 km || 
|-id=317 bgcolor=#fefefe
| 38317 ||  || — || September 9, 1999 || Socorro || LINEAR || — || align=right | 3.0 km || 
|-id=318 bgcolor=#E9E9E9
| 38318 ||  || — || September 9, 1999 || Socorro || LINEAR || — || align=right | 4.3 km || 
|-id=319 bgcolor=#E9E9E9
| 38319 ||  || — || September 9, 1999 || Socorro || LINEAR || — || align=right | 4.6 km || 
|-id=320 bgcolor=#d6d6d6
| 38320 ||  || — || September 9, 1999 || Socorro || LINEAR || — || align=right | 7.7 km || 
|-id=321 bgcolor=#E9E9E9
| 38321 ||  || — || September 9, 1999 || Socorro || LINEAR || — || align=right | 3.7 km || 
|-id=322 bgcolor=#fefefe
| 38322 ||  || — || September 9, 1999 || Socorro || LINEAR || — || align=right | 5.5 km || 
|-id=323 bgcolor=#E9E9E9
| 38323 ||  || — || September 9, 1999 || Socorro || LINEAR || MAR || align=right | 4.7 km || 
|-id=324 bgcolor=#E9E9E9
| 38324 ||  || — || September 9, 1999 || Socorro || LINEAR || HEN || align=right | 2.7 km || 
|-id=325 bgcolor=#E9E9E9
| 38325 ||  || — || September 9, 1999 || Socorro || LINEAR || HEN || align=right | 2.9 km || 
|-id=326 bgcolor=#d6d6d6
| 38326 ||  || — || September 9, 1999 || Socorro || LINEAR || FIR || align=right | 9.4 km || 
|-id=327 bgcolor=#fefefe
| 38327 ||  || — || September 9, 1999 || Socorro || LINEAR || — || align=right | 1.9 km || 
|-id=328 bgcolor=#fefefe
| 38328 ||  || — || September 9, 1999 || Socorro || LINEAR || NYS || align=right | 2.1 km || 
|-id=329 bgcolor=#d6d6d6
| 38329 ||  || — || September 9, 1999 || Socorro || LINEAR || — || align=right | 6.1 km || 
|-id=330 bgcolor=#fefefe
| 38330 ||  || — || September 9, 1999 || Socorro || LINEAR || NYS || align=right | 3.4 km || 
|-id=331 bgcolor=#E9E9E9
| 38331 ||  || — || September 9, 1999 || Socorro || LINEAR || ADE || align=right | 5.8 km || 
|-id=332 bgcolor=#E9E9E9
| 38332 ||  || — || September 9, 1999 || Socorro || LINEAR || GEF || align=right | 4.4 km || 
|-id=333 bgcolor=#E9E9E9
| 38333 ||  || — || September 9, 1999 || Socorro || LINEAR || — || align=right | 4.2 km || 
|-id=334 bgcolor=#d6d6d6
| 38334 ||  || — || September 9, 1999 || Socorro || LINEAR || URS || align=right | 5.5 km || 
|-id=335 bgcolor=#fefefe
| 38335 ||  || — || September 9, 1999 || Socorro || LINEAR || V || align=right | 2.9 km || 
|-id=336 bgcolor=#fefefe
| 38336 ||  || — || September 9, 1999 || Socorro || LINEAR || — || align=right | 2.3 km || 
|-id=337 bgcolor=#E9E9E9
| 38337 ||  || — || September 9, 1999 || Socorro || LINEAR || — || align=right | 4.4 km || 
|-id=338 bgcolor=#E9E9E9
| 38338 ||  || — || September 9, 1999 || Socorro || LINEAR || — || align=right | 2.8 km || 
|-id=339 bgcolor=#E9E9E9
| 38339 ||  || — || September 9, 1999 || Socorro || LINEAR || MAR || align=right | 3.4 km || 
|-id=340 bgcolor=#d6d6d6
| 38340 ||  || — || September 9, 1999 || Socorro || LINEAR || KOR || align=right | 4.2 km || 
|-id=341 bgcolor=#fefefe
| 38341 ||  || — || September 9, 1999 || Socorro || LINEAR || — || align=right | 5.3 km || 
|-id=342 bgcolor=#E9E9E9
| 38342 ||  || — || September 9, 1999 || Socorro || LINEAR || — || align=right | 4.1 km || 
|-id=343 bgcolor=#fefefe
| 38343 ||  || — || September 9, 1999 || Socorro || LINEAR || — || align=right | 2.4 km || 
|-id=344 bgcolor=#E9E9E9
| 38344 ||  || — || September 9, 1999 || Socorro || LINEAR || HEN || align=right | 3.8 km || 
|-id=345 bgcolor=#fefefe
| 38345 ||  || — || September 9, 1999 || Socorro || LINEAR || V || align=right | 2.1 km || 
|-id=346 bgcolor=#E9E9E9
| 38346 ||  || — || September 9, 1999 || Socorro || LINEAR || — || align=right | 6.1 km || 
|-id=347 bgcolor=#d6d6d6
| 38347 ||  || — || September 9, 1999 || Socorro || LINEAR || — || align=right | 5.5 km || 
|-id=348 bgcolor=#E9E9E9
| 38348 ||  || — || September 9, 1999 || Socorro || LINEAR || — || align=right | 6.7 km || 
|-id=349 bgcolor=#d6d6d6
| 38349 ||  || — || September 9, 1999 || Socorro || LINEAR || EOS || align=right | 5.6 km || 
|-id=350 bgcolor=#E9E9E9
| 38350 ||  || — || September 9, 1999 || Socorro || LINEAR || — || align=right | 9.1 km || 
|-id=351 bgcolor=#E9E9E9
| 38351 ||  || — || September 9, 1999 || Socorro || LINEAR || — || align=right | 6.0 km || 
|-id=352 bgcolor=#E9E9E9
| 38352 ||  || — || September 9, 1999 || Socorro || LINEAR || — || align=right | 3.2 km || 
|-id=353 bgcolor=#E9E9E9
| 38353 ||  || — || September 9, 1999 || Socorro || LINEAR || — || align=right | 4.1 km || 
|-id=354 bgcolor=#E9E9E9
| 38354 ||  || — || September 9, 1999 || Socorro || LINEAR || — || align=right | 2.6 km || 
|-id=355 bgcolor=#fefefe
| 38355 ||  || — || September 9, 1999 || Socorro || LINEAR || — || align=right | 3.3 km || 
|-id=356 bgcolor=#d6d6d6
| 38356 ||  || — || September 9, 1999 || Socorro || LINEAR || — || align=right | 6.6 km || 
|-id=357 bgcolor=#E9E9E9
| 38357 ||  || — || September 9, 1999 || Socorro || LINEAR || MAR || align=right | 4.8 km || 
|-id=358 bgcolor=#E9E9E9
| 38358 ||  || — || September 9, 1999 || Socorro || LINEAR || — || align=right | 4.6 km || 
|-id=359 bgcolor=#E9E9E9
| 38359 ||  || — || September 9, 1999 || Socorro || LINEAR || — || align=right | 2.8 km || 
|-id=360 bgcolor=#fefefe
| 38360 ||  || — || September 9, 1999 || Socorro || LINEAR || NYS || align=right | 2.4 km || 
|-id=361 bgcolor=#d6d6d6
| 38361 ||  || — || September 9, 1999 || Socorro || LINEAR || EOS || align=right | 5.4 km || 
|-id=362 bgcolor=#d6d6d6
| 38362 ||  || — || September 9, 1999 || Socorro || LINEAR || — || align=right | 5.0 km || 
|-id=363 bgcolor=#d6d6d6
| 38363 ||  || — || September 9, 1999 || Socorro || LINEAR || — || align=right | 6.8 km || 
|-id=364 bgcolor=#d6d6d6
| 38364 ||  || — || September 9, 1999 || Socorro || LINEAR || HYG || align=right | 7.9 km || 
|-id=365 bgcolor=#d6d6d6
| 38365 ||  || — || September 9, 1999 || Socorro || LINEAR || THM || align=right | 7.8 km || 
|-id=366 bgcolor=#d6d6d6
| 38366 ||  || — || September 9, 1999 || Socorro || LINEAR || KOR || align=right | 3.8 km || 
|-id=367 bgcolor=#d6d6d6
| 38367 ||  || — || September 9, 1999 || Socorro || LINEAR || — || align=right | 8.8 km || 
|-id=368 bgcolor=#E9E9E9
| 38368 ||  || — || September 9, 1999 || Socorro || LINEAR || — || align=right | 5.4 km || 
|-id=369 bgcolor=#d6d6d6
| 38369 ||  || — || September 9, 1999 || Socorro || LINEAR || — || align=right | 8.0 km || 
|-id=370 bgcolor=#E9E9E9
| 38370 ||  || — || September 9, 1999 || Socorro || LINEAR || — || align=right | 3.2 km || 
|-id=371 bgcolor=#d6d6d6
| 38371 ||  || — || September 9, 1999 || Socorro || LINEAR || EOS || align=right | 6.8 km || 
|-id=372 bgcolor=#E9E9E9
| 38372 ||  || — || September 9, 1999 || Socorro || LINEAR || — || align=right | 6.7 km || 
|-id=373 bgcolor=#E9E9E9
| 38373 ||  || — || September 9, 1999 || Socorro || LINEAR || — || align=right | 5.0 km || 
|-id=374 bgcolor=#E9E9E9
| 38374 ||  || — || September 9, 1999 || Socorro || LINEAR || HNS || align=right | 4.6 km || 
|-id=375 bgcolor=#fefefe
| 38375 ||  || — || September 9, 1999 || Socorro || LINEAR || — || align=right | 2.4 km || 
|-id=376 bgcolor=#E9E9E9
| 38376 ||  || — || September 9, 1999 || Socorro || LINEAR || — || align=right | 2.4 km || 
|-id=377 bgcolor=#d6d6d6
| 38377 ||  || — || September 9, 1999 || Socorro || LINEAR || TRP || align=right | 5.9 km || 
|-id=378 bgcolor=#d6d6d6
| 38378 ||  || — || September 9, 1999 || Socorro || LINEAR || — || align=right | 6.2 km || 
|-id=379 bgcolor=#E9E9E9
| 38379 ||  || — || September 9, 1999 || Socorro || LINEAR || — || align=right | 2.6 km || 
|-id=380 bgcolor=#E9E9E9
| 38380 ||  || — || September 9, 1999 || Socorro || LINEAR || MAR || align=right | 3.7 km || 
|-id=381 bgcolor=#E9E9E9
| 38381 ||  || — || September 9, 1999 || Socorro || LINEAR || — || align=right | 2.6 km || 
|-id=382 bgcolor=#d6d6d6
| 38382 ||  || — || September 9, 1999 || Socorro || LINEAR || — || align=right | 5.1 km || 
|-id=383 bgcolor=#E9E9E9
| 38383 ||  || — || September 9, 1999 || Socorro || LINEAR || — || align=right | 6.2 km || 
|-id=384 bgcolor=#d6d6d6
| 38384 ||  || — || September 9, 1999 || Socorro || LINEAR || KOR || align=right | 4.2 km || 
|-id=385 bgcolor=#E9E9E9
| 38385 ||  || — || September 9, 1999 || Socorro || LINEAR || — || align=right | 3.9 km || 
|-id=386 bgcolor=#d6d6d6
| 38386 ||  || — || September 9, 1999 || Socorro || LINEAR || EOS || align=right | 4.8 km || 
|-id=387 bgcolor=#d6d6d6
| 38387 ||  || — || September 9, 1999 || Socorro || LINEAR || KOR || align=right | 4.7 km || 
|-id=388 bgcolor=#E9E9E9
| 38388 ||  || — || September 9, 1999 || Socorro || LINEAR || — || align=right | 3.0 km || 
|-id=389 bgcolor=#E9E9E9
| 38389 ||  || — || September 9, 1999 || Socorro || LINEAR || — || align=right | 5.8 km || 
|-id=390 bgcolor=#d6d6d6
| 38390 ||  || — || September 9, 1999 || Socorro || LINEAR || — || align=right | 3.9 km || 
|-id=391 bgcolor=#d6d6d6
| 38391 ||  || — || September 9, 1999 || Socorro || LINEAR || — || align=right | 3.1 km || 
|-id=392 bgcolor=#d6d6d6
| 38392 ||  || — || September 9, 1999 || Socorro || LINEAR || — || align=right | 7.5 km || 
|-id=393 bgcolor=#E9E9E9
| 38393 ||  || — || September 11, 1999 || Socorro || LINEAR || — || align=right | 5.1 km || 
|-id=394 bgcolor=#d6d6d6
| 38394 ||  || — || September 13, 1999 || Socorro || LINEAR || THM || align=right | 7.7 km || 
|-id=395 bgcolor=#d6d6d6
| 38395 ||  || — || September 15, 1999 || Kitt Peak || Spacewatch || SYL7:4 || align=right | 12 km || 
|-id=396 bgcolor=#d6d6d6
| 38396 ||  || — || September 7, 1999 || Socorro || LINEAR || — || align=right | 8.7 km || 
|-id=397 bgcolor=#d6d6d6
| 38397 ||  || — || September 7, 1999 || Socorro || LINEAR || — || align=right | 6.6 km || 
|-id=398 bgcolor=#d6d6d6
| 38398 ||  || — || September 8, 1999 || Socorro || LINEAR || — || align=right | 9.7 km || 
|-id=399 bgcolor=#E9E9E9
| 38399 ||  || — || September 8, 1999 || Socorro || LINEAR || EUN || align=right | 4.8 km || 
|-id=400 bgcolor=#d6d6d6
| 38400 ||  || — || September 8, 1999 || Socorro || LINEAR || — || align=right | 8.9 km || 
|}

38401–38500 

|-bgcolor=#d6d6d6
| 38401 ||  || — || September 8, 1999 || Socorro || LINEAR || — || align=right | 7.7 km || 
|-id=402 bgcolor=#d6d6d6
| 38402 ||  || — || September 8, 1999 || Socorro || LINEAR || — || align=right | 5.1 km || 
|-id=403 bgcolor=#E9E9E9
| 38403 ||  || — || September 8, 1999 || Socorro || LINEAR || MAR || align=right | 5.2 km || 
|-id=404 bgcolor=#d6d6d6
| 38404 ||  || — || September 8, 1999 || Socorro || LINEAR || — || align=right | 10 km || 
|-id=405 bgcolor=#d6d6d6
| 38405 ||  || — || September 8, 1999 || Socorro || LINEAR || — || align=right | 8.2 km || 
|-id=406 bgcolor=#d6d6d6
| 38406 ||  || — || September 8, 1999 || Socorro || LINEAR || — || align=right | 9.7 km || 
|-id=407 bgcolor=#E9E9E9
| 38407 ||  || — || September 8, 1999 || Socorro || LINEAR || GEF || align=right | 6.0 km || 
|-id=408 bgcolor=#E9E9E9
| 38408 ||  || — || September 8, 1999 || Socorro || LINEAR || — || align=right | 3.4 km || 
|-id=409 bgcolor=#d6d6d6
| 38409 ||  || — || September 8, 1999 || Socorro || LINEAR || — || align=right | 9.7 km || 
|-id=410 bgcolor=#d6d6d6
| 38410 ||  || — || September 8, 1999 || Socorro || LINEAR || — || align=right | 8.0 km || 
|-id=411 bgcolor=#d6d6d6
| 38411 ||  || — || September 8, 1999 || Socorro || LINEAR || — || align=right | 8.0 km || 
|-id=412 bgcolor=#d6d6d6
| 38412 ||  || — || September 8, 1999 || Socorro || LINEAR || — || align=right | 7.4 km || 
|-id=413 bgcolor=#d6d6d6
| 38413 ||  || — || September 8, 1999 || Socorro || LINEAR || — || align=right | 4.2 km || 
|-id=414 bgcolor=#E9E9E9
| 38414 ||  || — || September 13, 1999 || Kitt Peak || Spacewatch || HEN || align=right | 2.3 km || 
|-id=415 bgcolor=#E9E9E9
| 38415 ||  || — || September 13, 1999 || Kitt Peak || Spacewatch || — || align=right | 3.9 km || 
|-id=416 bgcolor=#d6d6d6
| 38416 ||  || — || September 13, 1999 || Kitt Peak || Spacewatch || KOR || align=right | 3.4 km || 
|-id=417 bgcolor=#E9E9E9
| 38417 ||  || — || September 4, 1999 || Catalina || CSS || — || align=right | 5.4 km || 
|-id=418 bgcolor=#E9E9E9
| 38418 ||  || — || September 5, 1999 || Kitt Peak || Spacewatch || — || align=right | 2.6 km || 
|-id=419 bgcolor=#d6d6d6
| 38419 ||  || — || September 4, 1999 || Catalina || CSS || VER || align=right | 7.6 km || 
|-id=420 bgcolor=#d6d6d6
| 38420 ||  || — || September 5, 1999 || Catalina || CSS || EOS || align=right | 5.7 km || 
|-id=421 bgcolor=#d6d6d6
| 38421 ||  || — || September 6, 1999 || Catalina || CSS || MEL || align=right | 6.5 km || 
|-id=422 bgcolor=#d6d6d6
| 38422 ||  || — || September 4, 1999 || Anderson Mesa || LONEOS || — || align=right | 6.3 km || 
|-id=423 bgcolor=#d6d6d6
| 38423 ||  || — || September 5, 1999 || Catalina || CSS || ALA || align=right | 8.7 km || 
|-id=424 bgcolor=#d6d6d6
| 38424 ||  || — || September 5, 1999 || Catalina || CSS || ALA || align=right | 8.7 km || 
|-id=425 bgcolor=#d6d6d6
| 38425 ||  || — || September 8, 1999 || Catalina || CSS || — || align=right | 7.8 km || 
|-id=426 bgcolor=#d6d6d6
| 38426 ||  || — || September 8, 1999 || Catalina || CSS || — || align=right | 6.3 km || 
|-id=427 bgcolor=#d6d6d6
| 38427 ||  || — || September 8, 1999 || Catalina || CSS || — || align=right | 6.5 km || 
|-id=428 bgcolor=#E9E9E9
| 38428 ||  || — || September 9, 1999 || Anderson Mesa || LONEOS || DOR || align=right | 7.2 km || 
|-id=429 bgcolor=#d6d6d6
| 38429 ||  || — || September 9, 1999 || Anderson Mesa || LONEOS || EOS || align=right | 6.6 km || 
|-id=430 bgcolor=#d6d6d6
| 38430 ||  || — || September 9, 1999 || Anderson Mesa || LONEOS || — || align=right | 9.4 km || 
|-id=431 bgcolor=#E9E9E9
| 38431 Jeffbeck ||  ||  || September 8, 1999 || Catalina || CSS || — || align=right | 5.7 km || 
|-id=432 bgcolor=#d6d6d6
| 38432 ||  || — || September 8, 1999 || Catalina || CSS || EOS || align=right | 5.2 km || 
|-id=433 bgcolor=#E9E9E9
| 38433 ||  || — || September 8, 1999 || Catalina || CSS || — || align=right | 5.2 km || 
|-id=434 bgcolor=#d6d6d6
| 38434 ||  || — || September 8, 1999 || Catalina || CSS || ALA || align=right | 11 km || 
|-id=435 bgcolor=#d6d6d6
| 38435 ||  || — || September 11, 1999 || Anderson Mesa || LONEOS || — || align=right | 10 km || 
|-id=436 bgcolor=#E9E9E9
| 38436 ||  || — || September 14, 1999 || Catalina || CSS || MIS || align=right | 5.7 km || 
|-id=437 bgcolor=#E9E9E9
| 38437 ||  || — || September 4, 1999 || Anderson Mesa || LONEOS || — || align=right | 2.9 km || 
|-id=438 bgcolor=#d6d6d6
| 38438 ||  || — || September 7, 1999 || Socorro || LINEAR || — || align=right | 6.2 km || 
|-id=439 bgcolor=#d6d6d6
| 38439 ||  || — || September 29, 1999 || Višnjan Observatory || K. Korlević || — || align=right | 6.5 km || 
|-id=440 bgcolor=#fefefe
| 38440 ||  || — || September 29, 1999 || Socorro || LINEAR || NYS || align=right | 2.8 km || 
|-id=441 bgcolor=#d6d6d6
| 38441 ||  || — || September 30, 1999 || Socorro || LINEAR || EOS || align=right | 7.9 km || 
|-id=442 bgcolor=#d6d6d6
| 38442 Szilárd ||  ||  || September 24, 1999 || Piszkéstető || K. Sárneczky, G. Szabó || KOR || align=right | 4.6 km || 
|-id=443 bgcolor=#d6d6d6
| 38443 ||  || — || September 29, 1999 || Socorro || LINEAR || EOS || align=right | 8.3 km || 
|-id=444 bgcolor=#E9E9E9
| 38444 ||  || — || September 29, 1999 || Woomera || F. B. Zoltowski || — || align=right | 5.0 km || 
|-id=445 bgcolor=#d6d6d6
| 38445 ||  || — || September 30, 1999 || Catalina || CSS || KOR || align=right | 3.4 km || 
|-id=446 bgcolor=#E9E9E9
| 38446 ||  || — || September 30, 1999 || Socorro || LINEAR || — || align=right | 4.0 km || 
|-id=447 bgcolor=#d6d6d6
| 38447 ||  || — || September 30, 1999 || Socorro || LINEAR || VER || align=right | 8.4 km || 
|-id=448 bgcolor=#E9E9E9
| 38448 ||  || — || September 30, 1999 || Socorro || LINEAR || — || align=right | 4.0 km || 
|-id=449 bgcolor=#E9E9E9
| 38449 ||  || — || September 30, 1999 || Kitt Peak || Spacewatch || — || align=right | 2.2 km || 
|-id=450 bgcolor=#d6d6d6
| 38450 || 1999 TH || — || October 2, 1999 || Prescott || P. G. Comba || — || align=right | 9.2 km || 
|-id=451 bgcolor=#E9E9E9
| 38451 || 1999 TU || — || October 1, 1999 || Višnjan Observatory || K. Korlević || — || align=right | 2.6 km || 
|-id=452 bgcolor=#d6d6d6
| 38452 ||  || — || October 1, 1999 || Višnjan Observatory || K. Korlević || THM || align=right | 8.4 km || 
|-id=453 bgcolor=#d6d6d6
| 38453 ||  || — || October 1, 1999 || Višnjan Observatory || K. Korlević || — || align=right | 19 km || 
|-id=454 bgcolor=#E9E9E9
| 38454 Boroson ||  ||  || October 2, 1999 || Fountain Hills || C. W. Juels || EUNslow || align=right | 6.3 km || 
|-id=455 bgcolor=#d6d6d6
| 38455 ||  || — || October 4, 1999 || Prescott || P. G. Comba || — || align=right | 6.8 km || 
|-id=456 bgcolor=#d6d6d6
| 38456 ||  || — || October 6, 1999 || Višnjan Observatory || K. Korlević, M. Jurić || THM || align=right | 9.2 km || 
|-id=457 bgcolor=#d6d6d6
| 38457 ||  || — || October 7, 1999 || Višnjan Observatory || K. Korlević, M. Jurić || — || align=right | 14 km || 
|-id=458 bgcolor=#E9E9E9
| 38458 ||  || — || October 12, 1999 || Prescott || P. G. Comba || EUN || align=right | 5.2 km || 
|-id=459 bgcolor=#d6d6d6
| 38459 ||  || — || October 10, 1999 || Fountain Hills || C. W. Juels || — || align=right | 12 km || 
|-id=460 bgcolor=#E9E9E9
| 38460 ||  || — || October 7, 1999 || Višnjan Observatory || K. Korlević, M. Jurić || — || align=right | 6.8 km || 
|-id=461 bgcolor=#d6d6d6
| 38461 Jiřítrnka ||  ||  || October 15, 1999 || Ondřejov || P. Pravec || — || align=right | 6.8 km || 
|-id=462 bgcolor=#d6d6d6
| 38462 ||  || — || October 12, 1999 || Bergisch Gladbach || W. Bickel || THM || align=right | 8.9 km || 
|-id=463 bgcolor=#d6d6d6
| 38463 ||  || — || October 3, 1999 || Kitt Peak || Spacewatch || THM || align=right | 5.2 km || 
|-id=464 bgcolor=#d6d6d6
| 38464 ||  || — || October 2, 1999 || Socorro || LINEAR || KOR || align=right | 3.5 km || 
|-id=465 bgcolor=#E9E9E9
| 38465 ||  || — || October 4, 1999 || Socorro || LINEAR || GEF || align=right | 5.1 km || 
|-id=466 bgcolor=#d6d6d6
| 38466 ||  || — || October 4, 1999 || Socorro || LINEAR || KOR || align=right | 4.1 km || 
|-id=467 bgcolor=#E9E9E9
| 38467 ||  || — || October 4, 1999 || Socorro || LINEAR || MRX || align=right | 2.7 km || 
|-id=468 bgcolor=#E9E9E9
| 38468 ||  || — || October 5, 1999 || Socorro || LINEAR || — || align=right | 5.4 km || 
|-id=469 bgcolor=#E9E9E9
| 38469 ||  || — || October 2, 1999 || Socorro || LINEAR || BRU || align=right | 7.6 km || 
|-id=470 bgcolor=#d6d6d6
| 38470 Deleflie ||  ||  || October 12, 1999 || Anderson Mesa || LONEOS || HIL3:2 || align=right | 12 km || 
|-id=471 bgcolor=#d6d6d6
| 38471 ||  || — || October 3, 1999 || Catalina || CSS || EOS || align=right | 5.9 km || 
|-id=472 bgcolor=#d6d6d6
| 38472 ||  || — || October 4, 1999 || Kitt Peak || Spacewatch || EOS || align=right | 6.5 km || 
|-id=473 bgcolor=#E9E9E9
| 38473 ||  || — || October 14, 1999 || Kitt Peak || Spacewatch || — || align=right | 2.2 km || 
|-id=474 bgcolor=#d6d6d6
| 38474 ||  || — || October 2, 1999 || Socorro || LINEAR || — || align=right | 5.0 km || 
|-id=475 bgcolor=#d6d6d6
| 38475 ||  || — || October 2, 1999 || Socorro || LINEAR || — || align=right | 9.0 km || 
|-id=476 bgcolor=#E9E9E9
| 38476 ||  || — || October 2, 1999 || Socorro || LINEAR || — || align=right | 7.1 km || 
|-id=477 bgcolor=#d6d6d6
| 38477 ||  || — || October 2, 1999 || Socorro || LINEAR || EOS || align=right | 5.4 km || 
|-id=478 bgcolor=#d6d6d6
| 38478 ||  || — || October 2, 1999 || Socorro || LINEAR || — || align=right | 7.7 km || 
|-id=479 bgcolor=#d6d6d6
| 38479 ||  || — || October 2, 1999 || Socorro || LINEAR || — || align=right | 6.3 km || 
|-id=480 bgcolor=#d6d6d6
| 38480 ||  || — || October 2, 1999 || Socorro || LINEAR || — || align=right | 9.3 km || 
|-id=481 bgcolor=#E9E9E9
| 38481 ||  || — || October 2, 1999 || Socorro || LINEAR || — || align=right | 4.3 km || 
|-id=482 bgcolor=#d6d6d6
| 38482 ||  || — || October 2, 1999 || Socorro || LINEAR || EOS || align=right | 7.3 km || 
|-id=483 bgcolor=#E9E9E9
| 38483 ||  || — || October 2, 1999 || Socorro || LINEAR || — || align=right | 5.0 km || 
|-id=484 bgcolor=#E9E9E9
| 38484 ||  || — || October 2, 1999 || Socorro || LINEAR || MAR || align=right | 3.2 km || 
|-id=485 bgcolor=#d6d6d6
| 38485 ||  || — || October 2, 1999 || Socorro || LINEAR || — || align=right | 6.9 km || 
|-id=486 bgcolor=#E9E9E9
| 38486 ||  || — || October 4, 1999 || Socorro || LINEAR || WIT || align=right | 2.8 km || 
|-id=487 bgcolor=#d6d6d6
| 38487 ||  || — || October 4, 1999 || Socorro || LINEAR || EOS || align=right | 6.1 km || 
|-id=488 bgcolor=#d6d6d6
| 38488 ||  || — || October 4, 1999 || Socorro || LINEAR || EOS || align=right | 6.1 km || 
|-id=489 bgcolor=#d6d6d6
| 38489 ||  || — || October 4, 1999 || Socorro || LINEAR || VER || align=right | 7.4 km || 
|-id=490 bgcolor=#d6d6d6
| 38490 ||  || — || October 4, 1999 || Socorro || LINEAR || KOR || align=right | 5.9 km || 
|-id=491 bgcolor=#d6d6d6
| 38491 ||  || — || October 4, 1999 || Socorro || LINEAR || — || align=right | 9.2 km || 
|-id=492 bgcolor=#d6d6d6
| 38492 ||  || — || October 4, 1999 || Socorro || LINEAR || — || align=right | 9.8 km || 
|-id=493 bgcolor=#d6d6d6
| 38493 ||  || — || October 4, 1999 || Socorro || LINEAR || — || align=right | 10 km || 
|-id=494 bgcolor=#d6d6d6
| 38494 ||  || — || October 4, 1999 || Socorro || LINEAR || — || align=right | 9.6 km || 
|-id=495 bgcolor=#d6d6d6
| 38495 ||  || — || October 4, 1999 || Socorro || LINEAR || — || align=right | 7.9 km || 
|-id=496 bgcolor=#d6d6d6
| 38496 ||  || — || October 4, 1999 || Socorro || LINEAR || — || align=right | 8.9 km || 
|-id=497 bgcolor=#d6d6d6
| 38497 ||  || — || October 6, 1999 || Socorro || LINEAR || — || align=right | 7.8 km || 
|-id=498 bgcolor=#d6d6d6
| 38498 ||  || — || October 7, 1999 || Socorro || LINEAR || — || align=right | 6.4 km || 
|-id=499 bgcolor=#d6d6d6
| 38499 ||  || — || October 9, 1999 || Socorro || LINEAR || — || align=right | 6.7 km || 
|-id=500 bgcolor=#d6d6d6
| 38500 ||  || — || October 10, 1999 || Socorro || LINEAR || EOS || align=right | 4.1 km || 
|}

38501–38600 

|-bgcolor=#d6d6d6
| 38501 ||  || — || October 10, 1999 || Socorro || LINEAR || THM || align=right | 6.4 km || 
|-id=502 bgcolor=#d6d6d6
| 38502 ||  || — || October 10, 1999 || Socorro || LINEAR || THM || align=right | 7.1 km || 
|-id=503 bgcolor=#d6d6d6
| 38503 ||  || — || October 12, 1999 || Socorro || LINEAR || — || align=right | 6.5 km || 
|-id=504 bgcolor=#E9E9E9
| 38504 ||  || — || October 12, 1999 || Socorro || LINEAR || — || align=right | 5.9 km || 
|-id=505 bgcolor=#d6d6d6
| 38505 ||  || — || October 12, 1999 || Socorro || LINEAR || — || align=right | 9.2 km || 
|-id=506 bgcolor=#d6d6d6
| 38506 ||  || — || October 12, 1999 || Socorro || LINEAR || — || align=right | 9.7 km || 
|-id=507 bgcolor=#d6d6d6
| 38507 ||  || — || October 12, 1999 || Socorro || LINEAR || — || align=right | 14 km || 
|-id=508 bgcolor=#d6d6d6
| 38508 ||  || — || October 15, 1999 || Socorro || LINEAR || — || align=right | 8.4 km || 
|-id=509 bgcolor=#E9E9E9
| 38509 ||  || — || October 1, 1999 || Catalina || CSS || — || align=right | 10 km || 
|-id=510 bgcolor=#d6d6d6
| 38510 ||  || — || October 2, 1999 || Catalina || CSS || VER || align=right | 6.4 km || 
|-id=511 bgcolor=#d6d6d6
| 38511 ||  || — || October 5, 1999 || Anderson Mesa || LONEOS || EMA || align=right | 8.4 km || 
|-id=512 bgcolor=#d6d6d6
| 38512 ||  || — || October 3, 1999 || Socorro || LINEAR || — || align=right | 11 km || 
|-id=513 bgcolor=#d6d6d6
| 38513 ||  || — || October 3, 1999 || Catalina || CSS || — || align=right | 6.5 km || 
|-id=514 bgcolor=#d6d6d6
| 38514 ||  || — || October 4, 1999 || Catalina || CSS || — || align=right | 10 km || 
|-id=515 bgcolor=#d6d6d6
| 38515 ||  || — || October 7, 1999 || Catalina || CSS || — || align=right | 11 km || 
|-id=516 bgcolor=#d6d6d6
| 38516 ||  || — || October 8, 1999 || Catalina || CSS || — || align=right | 17 km || 
|-id=517 bgcolor=#E9E9E9
| 38517 ||  || — || October 9, 1999 || Catalina || CSS || DOR || align=right | 6.6 km || 
|-id=518 bgcolor=#E9E9E9
| 38518 ||  || — || October 8, 1999 || Socorro || LINEAR || — || align=right | 4.2 km || 
|-id=519 bgcolor=#d6d6d6
| 38519 ||  || — || October 9, 1999 || Socorro || LINEAR || EOS || align=right | 5.8 km || 
|-id=520 bgcolor=#d6d6d6
| 38520 ||  || — || October 9, 1999 || Kitt Peak || Spacewatch || — || align=right | 4.8 km || 
|-id=521 bgcolor=#d6d6d6
| 38521 ||  || — || October 14, 1999 || Socorro || LINEAR || — || align=right | 11 km || 
|-id=522 bgcolor=#d6d6d6
| 38522 ||  || — || October 3, 1999 || Socorro || LINEAR || ALA || align=right | 12 km || 
|-id=523 bgcolor=#d6d6d6
| 38523 ||  || — || October 7, 1999 || Socorro || LINEAR || EOS || align=right | 7.8 km || 
|-id=524 bgcolor=#d6d6d6
| 38524 ||  || — || October 10, 1999 || Socorro || LINEAR || — || align=right | 7.0 km || 
|-id=525 bgcolor=#d6d6d6
| 38525 ||  || — || October 10, 1999 || Socorro || LINEAR || — || align=right | 9.1 km || 
|-id=526 bgcolor=#d6d6d6
| 38526 ||  || — || October 1, 1999 || Catalina || CSS || THM || align=right | 8.7 km || 
|-id=527 bgcolor=#d6d6d6
| 38527 ||  || — || October 9, 1999 || Socorro || LINEAR || THM || align=right | 7.1 km || 
|-id=528 bgcolor=#d6d6d6
| 38528 ||  || — || October 31, 1999 || Fountain Hills || C. W. Juels || EOS || align=right | 7.0 km || 
|-id=529 bgcolor=#d6d6d6
| 38529 ||  || — || October 29, 1999 || Xinglong || SCAP || — || align=right | 7.4 km || 
|-id=530 bgcolor=#d6d6d6
| 38530 ||  || — || October 29, 1999 || Catalina || CSS || KOR || align=right | 4.7 km || 
|-id=531 bgcolor=#d6d6d6
| 38531 ||  || — || October 29, 1999 || Catalina || CSS || — || align=right | 12 km || 
|-id=532 bgcolor=#E9E9E9
| 38532 ||  || — || October 28, 1999 || Catalina || CSS || — || align=right | 8.5 km || 
|-id=533 bgcolor=#d6d6d6
| 38533 ||  || — || October 31, 1999 || Kitt Peak || Spacewatch || THM || align=right | 6.9 km || 
|-id=534 bgcolor=#d6d6d6
| 38534 ||  || — || October 31, 1999 || Kitt Peak || Spacewatch || TIR || align=right | 4.8 km || 
|-id=535 bgcolor=#d6d6d6
| 38535 ||  || — || October 28, 1999 || Catalina || CSS || EOS || align=right | 8.6 km || 
|-id=536 bgcolor=#d6d6d6
| 38536 ||  || — || October 28, 1999 || Catalina || CSS || — || align=right | 9.5 km || 
|-id=537 bgcolor=#d6d6d6
| 38537 ||  || — || October 28, 1999 || Catalina || CSS || — || align=right | 9.5 km || 
|-id=538 bgcolor=#d6d6d6
| 38538 ||  || — || October 30, 1999 || Catalina || CSS || EOS || align=right | 5.7 km || 
|-id=539 bgcolor=#d6d6d6
| 38539 ||  || — || October 31, 1999 || Catalina || CSS || — || align=right | 6.4 km || 
|-id=540 bgcolor=#d6d6d6
| 38540 Stevens ||  ||  || November 5, 1999 || Jornada || D. S. Dixon || EOS || align=right | 7.6 km || 
|-id=541 bgcolor=#d6d6d6
| 38541 Rustichelli ||  ||  || November 7, 1999 || Cavezzo || Cavezzo Obs. || HYG || align=right | 7.6 km || 
|-id=542 bgcolor=#d6d6d6
| 38542 ||  || — || November 7, 1999 || Višnjan Observatory || K. Korlević || — || align=right | 9.4 km || 
|-id=543 bgcolor=#d6d6d6
| 38543 ||  || — || November 9, 1999 || Fountain Hills || C. W. Juels || — || align=right | 6.5 km || 
|-id=544 bgcolor=#d6d6d6
| 38544 ||  || — || November 12, 1999 || Višnjan Observatory || K. Korlević || — || align=right | 11 km || 
|-id=545 bgcolor=#d6d6d6
| 38545 ||  || — || November 3, 1999 || Catalina || CSS || CRO || align=right | 11 km || 
|-id=546 bgcolor=#d6d6d6
| 38546 ||  || — || November 3, 1999 || Socorro || LINEAR || — || align=right | 7.8 km || 
|-id=547 bgcolor=#d6d6d6
| 38547 ||  || — || November 3, 1999 || Socorro || LINEAR || — || align=right | 6.9 km || 
|-id=548 bgcolor=#d6d6d6
| 38548 ||  || — || November 3, 1999 || Socorro || LINEAR || — || align=right | 22 km || 
|-id=549 bgcolor=#E9E9E9
| 38549 ||  || — || November 3, 1999 || Socorro || LINEAR || — || align=right | 3.1 km || 
|-id=550 bgcolor=#d6d6d6
| 38550 ||  || — || November 4, 1999 || Socorro || LINEAR || — || align=right | 12 km || 
|-id=551 bgcolor=#d6d6d6
| 38551 ||  || — || November 4, 1999 || Socorro || LINEAR || THM || align=right | 6.3 km || 
|-id=552 bgcolor=#d6d6d6
| 38552 ||  || — || November 4, 1999 || Socorro || LINEAR || — || align=right | 7.7 km || 
|-id=553 bgcolor=#d6d6d6
| 38553 ||  || — || November 4, 1999 || Socorro || LINEAR || 3:2 || align=right | 8.4 km || 
|-id=554 bgcolor=#d6d6d6
| 38554 ||  || — || November 4, 1999 || Socorro || LINEAR || HYG || align=right | 12 km || 
|-id=555 bgcolor=#d6d6d6
| 38555 ||  || — || November 1, 1999 || Kitt Peak || Spacewatch || — || align=right | 6.5 km || 
|-id=556 bgcolor=#d6d6d6
| 38556 ||  || — || November 5, 1999 || Socorro || LINEAR || — || align=right | 14 km || 
|-id=557 bgcolor=#d6d6d6
| 38557 ||  || — || November 9, 1999 || Socorro || LINEAR || — || align=right | 7.3 km || 
|-id=558 bgcolor=#d6d6d6
| 38558 ||  || — || November 9, 1999 || Catalina || CSS || — || align=right | 11 km || 
|-id=559 bgcolor=#d6d6d6
| 38559 ||  || — || November 9, 1999 || Catalina || CSS || — || align=right | 11 km || 
|-id=560 bgcolor=#d6d6d6
| 38560 ||  || — || November 5, 1999 || Kitt Peak || Spacewatch || THM || align=right | 7.1 km || 
|-id=561 bgcolor=#E9E9E9
| 38561 ||  || — || November 10, 1999 || Kitt Peak || Spacewatch || — || align=right | 2.1 km || 
|-id=562 bgcolor=#d6d6d6
| 38562 ||  || — || November 10, 1999 || Kitt Peak || Spacewatch || HYG || align=right | 8.6 km || 
|-id=563 bgcolor=#d6d6d6
| 38563 ||  || — || November 10, 1999 || Kitt Peak || Spacewatch || THM || align=right | 5.8 km || 
|-id=564 bgcolor=#d6d6d6
| 38564 ||  || — || November 11, 1999 || Catalina || CSS || — || align=right | 6.8 km || 
|-id=565 bgcolor=#E9E9E9
| 38565 ||  || — || November 12, 1999 || Socorro || LINEAR || — || align=right | 3.6 km || 
|-id=566 bgcolor=#E9E9E9
| 38566 ||  || — || November 14, 1999 || Socorro || LINEAR || — || align=right | 4.6 km || 
|-id=567 bgcolor=#d6d6d6
| 38567 ||  || — || November 14, 1999 || Socorro || LINEAR || HYG || align=right | 11 km || 
|-id=568 bgcolor=#d6d6d6
| 38568 ||  || — || November 15, 1999 || Socorro || LINEAR || — || align=right | 6.6 km || 
|-id=569 bgcolor=#d6d6d6
| 38569 ||  || — || November 3, 1999 || Catalina || CSS || VER || align=right | 8.0 km || 
|-id=570 bgcolor=#d6d6d6
| 38570 ||  || — || November 2, 1999 || Catalina || CSS || — || align=right | 7.5 km || 
|-id=571 bgcolor=#d6d6d6
| 38571 ||  || — || November 14, 1999 || Catalina || CSS || HYG || align=right | 5.6 km || 
|-id=572 bgcolor=#d6d6d6
| 38572 ||  || — || November 5, 1999 || Socorro || LINEAR || EOS || align=right | 7.7 km || 
|-id=573 bgcolor=#d6d6d6
| 38573 ||  || — || November 19, 1999 || High Point || D. K. Chesney || — || align=right | 14 km || 
|-id=574 bgcolor=#C2FFFF
| 38574 ||  || — || November 28, 1999 || Oizumi || T. Kobayashi || L4 || align=right | 17 km || 
|-id=575 bgcolor=#E9E9E9
| 38575 ||  || — || December 2, 1999 || Kitt Peak || Spacewatch || — || align=right | 5.5 km || 
|-id=576 bgcolor=#d6d6d6
| 38576 ||  || — || December 4, 1999 || Catalina || CSS || — || align=right | 6.2 km || 
|-id=577 bgcolor=#d6d6d6
| 38577 ||  || — || December 5, 1999 || Catalina || CSS || ALA || align=right | 19 km || 
|-id=578 bgcolor=#d6d6d6
| 38578 ||  || — || December 6, 1999 || Catalina || CSS || 7:4 || align=right | 11 km || 
|-id=579 bgcolor=#d6d6d6
| 38579 ||  || — || December 5, 1999 || Višnjan Observatory || K. Korlević || 3:2 || align=right | 12 km || 
|-id=580 bgcolor=#fefefe
| 38580 ||  || — || December 2, 1999 || Socorro || LINEAR || — || align=right | 6.6 km || 
|-id=581 bgcolor=#d6d6d6
| 38581 ||  || — || December 2, 1999 || Socorro || LINEAR || — || align=right | 7.8 km || 
|-id=582 bgcolor=#d6d6d6
| 38582 ||  || — || December 7, 1999 || Fountain Hills || C. W. Juels || EOS || align=right | 11 km || 
|-id=583 bgcolor=#d6d6d6
| 38583 ||  || — || December 7, 1999 || Socorro || LINEAR || HYG || align=right | 7.9 km || 
|-id=584 bgcolor=#d6d6d6
| 38584 ||  || — || December 7, 1999 || Socorro || LINEAR || — || align=right | 8.3 km || 
|-id=585 bgcolor=#C2FFFF
| 38585 ||  || — || December 7, 1999 || Socorro || LINEAR || L4 || align=right | 13 km || 
|-id=586 bgcolor=#d6d6d6
| 38586 ||  || — || December 7, 1999 || Socorro || LINEAR || — || align=right | 5.6 km || 
|-id=587 bgcolor=#d6d6d6
| 38587 ||  || — || December 7, 1999 || Socorro || LINEAR || — || align=right | 11 km || 
|-id=588 bgcolor=#fefefe
| 38588 ||  || — || December 7, 1999 || Socorro || LINEAR || V || align=right | 2.0 km || 
|-id=589 bgcolor=#d6d6d6
| 38589 ||  || — || December 11, 1999 || Socorro || LINEAR || — || align=right | 12 km || 
|-id=590 bgcolor=#d6d6d6
| 38590 ||  || — || December 5, 1999 || Catalina || CSS || — || align=right | 7.2 km || 
|-id=591 bgcolor=#d6d6d6
| 38591 ||  || — || December 5, 1999 || Catalina || CSS || LIX || align=right | 13 km || 
|-id=592 bgcolor=#C2FFFF
| 38592 ||  || — || December 13, 1999 || Socorro || LINEAR || L4 || align=right | 24 km || 
|-id=593 bgcolor=#d6d6d6
| 38593 ||  || — || December 10, 1999 || Socorro || LINEAR || THB || align=right | 8.2 km || 
|-id=594 bgcolor=#C2FFFF
| 38594 ||  || — || December 12, 1999 || Socorro || LINEAR || L4 || align=right | 20 km || 
|-id=595 bgcolor=#E9E9E9
| 38595 ||  || — || December 12, 1999 || Socorro || LINEAR || — || align=right | 9.7 km || 
|-id=596 bgcolor=#C2FFFF
| 38596 ||  || — || December 12, 1999 || Socorro || LINEAR || L4 || align=right | 13 km || 
|-id=597 bgcolor=#C2FFFF
| 38597 ||  || — || December 12, 1999 || Socorro || LINEAR || L4 || align=right | 21 km || 
|-id=598 bgcolor=#C2FFFF
| 38598 ||  || — || December 13, 1999 || Socorro || LINEAR || L4 || align=right | 13 km || 
|-id=599 bgcolor=#C2FFFF
| 38599 ||  || — || December 13, 1999 || Socorro || LINEAR || L4 || align=right | 23 km || 
|-id=600 bgcolor=#C2FFFF
| 38600 ||  || — || December 14, 1999 || Socorro || LINEAR || L4 || align=right | 23 km || 
|}

38601–38700 

|-bgcolor=#d6d6d6
| 38601 ||  || — || December 7, 1999 || Catalina || CSS || SYL7:4 || align=right | 10 km || 
|-id=602 bgcolor=#d6d6d6
| 38602 ||  || — || December 7, 1999 || Catalina || CSS || — || align=right | 13 km || 
|-id=603 bgcolor=#E9E9E9
| 38603 ||  || — || December 13, 1999 || Catalina || CSS || — || align=right | 4.2 km || 
|-id=604 bgcolor=#d6d6d6
| 38604 ||  || — || December 27, 1999 || Farpoint || G. Hug, G. Bell || — || align=right | 9.7 km || 
|-id=605 bgcolor=#d6d6d6
| 38605 ||  || — || December 27, 1999 || Kitt Peak || Spacewatch || HYG || align=right | 9.9 km || 
|-id=606 bgcolor=#C2FFFF
| 38606 ||  || — || December 31, 1999 || Višnjan Observatory || K. Korlević || L4 || align=right | 24 km || 
|-id=607 bgcolor=#C2FFFF
| 38607 ||  || — || January 4, 2000 || Prescott || P. G. Comba || L4 || align=right | 23 km || 
|-id=608 bgcolor=#d6d6d6
| 38608 ||  || — || January 3, 2000 || Socorro || LINEAR || KOR || align=right | 3.8 km || 
|-id=609 bgcolor=#C2FFFF
| 38609 ||  || — || January 3, 2000 || Socorro || LINEAR || L4 || align=right | 20 km || 
|-id=610 bgcolor=#C2FFFF
| 38610 ||  || — || January 3, 2000 || Socorro || LINEAR || L4 || align=right | 29 km || 
|-id=611 bgcolor=#C2FFFF
| 38611 ||  || — || January 5, 2000 || Socorro || LINEAR || L4 || align=right | 19 km || 
|-id=612 bgcolor=#fefefe
| 38612 ||  || — || January 5, 2000 || Socorro || LINEAR || — || align=right | 3.6 km || 
|-id=613 bgcolor=#d6d6d6
| 38613 ||  || — || January 5, 2000 || Socorro || LINEAR || 3:2 || align=right | 24 km || 
|-id=614 bgcolor=#C2FFFF
| 38614 ||  || — || January 5, 2000 || Socorro || LINEAR || L4 || align=right | 17 km || 
|-id=615 bgcolor=#C2FFFF
| 38615 ||  || — || January 5, 2000 || Socorro || LINEAR || L4 || align=right | 21 km || 
|-id=616 bgcolor=#d6d6d6
| 38616 ||  || — || January 7, 2000 || Socorro || LINEAR || — || align=right | 11 km || 
|-id=617 bgcolor=#C2FFFF
| 38617 ||  || — || January 4, 2000 || Socorro || LINEAR || L4 || align=right | 16 km || 
|-id=618 bgcolor=#fefefe
| 38618 ||  || — || January 8, 2000 || Socorro || LINEAR || — || align=right | 3.3 km || 
|-id=619 bgcolor=#C2FFFF
| 38619 ||  || — || January 7, 2000 || Socorro || LINEAR || L4 || align=right | 21 km || 
|-id=620 bgcolor=#d6d6d6
| 38620 ||  || — || January 8, 2000 || Socorro || LINEAR || — || align=right | 5.4 km || 
|-id=621 bgcolor=#C2FFFF
| 38621 ||  || — || January 9, 2000 || Socorro || LINEAR || L4 || align=right | 20 km || 
|-id=622 bgcolor=#d6d6d6
| 38622 ||  || — || January 4, 2000 || Anderson Mesa || LONEOS || — || align=right | 9.5 km || 
|-id=623 bgcolor=#d6d6d6
| 38623 ||  || — || January 5, 2000 || Socorro || LINEAR || — || align=right | 11 km || 
|-id=624 bgcolor=#E9E9E9
| 38624 ||  || — || February 2, 2000 || Socorro || LINEAR || — || align=right | 2.5 km || 
|-id=625 bgcolor=#d6d6d6
| 38625 ||  || — || February 2, 2000 || Socorro || LINEAR || — || align=right | 6.4 km || 
|-id=626 bgcolor=#fefefe
| 38626 ||  || — || March 12, 2000 || Socorro || LINEAR || H || align=right | 2.0 km || 
|-id=627 bgcolor=#fefefe
| 38627 ||  || — || March 11, 2000 || Anderson Mesa || LONEOS || FLO || align=right | 2.7 km || 
|-id=628 bgcolor=#C2E0FF
| 38628 Huya ||  ||  || March 10, 2000 || Mérida || I. R. Ferrín || plutinomoon || align=right | 477 km || 
|-id=629 bgcolor=#E9E9E9
| 38629 ||  || — || March 4, 2000 || Socorro || LINEAR || — || align=right | 3.7 km || 
|-id=630 bgcolor=#fefefe
| 38630 ||  || — || April 5, 2000 || Socorro || LINEAR || FLO || align=right | 1.7 km || 
|-id=631 bgcolor=#d6d6d6
| 38631 ||  || — || May 28, 2000 || Socorro || LINEAR || — || align=right | 8.6 km || 
|-id=632 bgcolor=#fefefe
| 38632 ||  || — || May 29, 2000 || Socorro || LINEAR || H || align=right | 1.8 km || 
|-id=633 bgcolor=#fefefe
| 38633 ||  || — || June 6, 2000 || Socorro || LINEAR || — || align=right | 4.2 km || 
|-id=634 bgcolor=#E9E9E9
| 38634 ||  || — || June 8, 2000 || Socorro || LINEAR || EUN || align=right | 4.4 km || 
|-id=635 bgcolor=#fefefe
| 38635 ||  || — || June 8, 2000 || Socorro || LINEAR || V || align=right | 1.6 km || 
|-id=636 bgcolor=#fefefe
| 38636 Kitazato ||  ||  || June 6, 2000 || Anderson Mesa || LONEOS || FLO || align=right | 1.3 km || 
|-id=637 bgcolor=#E9E9E9
| 38637 ||  || — || June 1, 2000 || Kitt Peak || Spacewatch || — || align=right | 3.5 km || 
|-id=638 bgcolor=#fefefe
| 38638 ||  || — || July 7, 2000 || Socorro || LINEAR || — || align=right | 1.6 km || 
|-id=639 bgcolor=#fefefe
| 38639 ||  || — || July 5, 2000 || Anderson Mesa || LONEOS || FLO || align=right | 1.3 km || 
|-id=640 bgcolor=#fefefe
| 38640 ||  || — || July 5, 2000 || Anderson Mesa || LONEOS || — || align=right | 1.8 km || 
|-id=641 bgcolor=#fefefe
| 38641 Philpott ||  ||  || July 5, 2000 || Anderson Mesa || LONEOS || NYS || align=right | 1.9 km || 
|-id=642 bgcolor=#E9E9E9
| 38642 ||  || — || July 5, 2000 || Anderson Mesa || LONEOS || — || align=right | 2.1 km || 
|-id=643 bgcolor=#fefefe
| 38643 ||  || — || July 5, 2000 || Anderson Mesa || LONEOS || — || align=right | 1.9 km || 
|-id=644 bgcolor=#E9E9E9
| 38644 ||  || — || July 7, 2000 || Socorro || LINEAR || — || align=right | 4.1 km || 
|-id=645 bgcolor=#E9E9E9
| 38645 ||  || — || July 24, 2000 || Socorro || LINEAR || — || align=right | 2.9 km || 
|-id=646 bgcolor=#E9E9E9
| 38646 ||  || — || July 24, 2000 || Socorro || LINEAR || — || align=right | 5.5 km || 
|-id=647 bgcolor=#FA8072
| 38647 ||  || — || July 31, 2000 || Socorro || LINEAR || — || align=right | 2.4 km || 
|-id=648 bgcolor=#fefefe
| 38648 ||  || — || July 23, 2000 || Socorro || LINEAR || NYS || align=right | 1.7 km || 
|-id=649 bgcolor=#E9E9E9
| 38649 ||  || — || July 23, 2000 || Socorro || LINEAR || — || align=right | 7.0 km || 
|-id=650 bgcolor=#E9E9E9
| 38650 ||  || — || July 23, 2000 || Socorro || LINEAR || ADE || align=right | 6.8 km || 
|-id=651 bgcolor=#fefefe
| 38651 ||  || — || July 23, 2000 || Socorro || LINEAR || NYS || align=right | 1.7 km || 
|-id=652 bgcolor=#E9E9E9
| 38652 ||  || — || July 31, 2000 || Socorro || LINEAR || — || align=right | 2.5 km || 
|-id=653 bgcolor=#E9E9E9
| 38653 ||  || — || July 31, 2000 || Socorro || LINEAR || — || align=right | 3.1 km || 
|-id=654 bgcolor=#fefefe
| 38654 ||  || — || July 23, 2000 || Socorro || LINEAR || NYS || align=right | 2.0 km || 
|-id=655 bgcolor=#E9E9E9
| 38655 ||  || — || July 30, 2000 || Socorro || LINEAR || EUN || align=right | 3.8 km || 
|-id=656 bgcolor=#E9E9E9
| 38656 ||  || — || July 30, 2000 || Socorro || LINEAR || MIT || align=right | 7.7 km || 
|-id=657 bgcolor=#fefefe
| 38657 ||  || — || July 31, 2000 || Socorro || LINEAR || ERI || align=right | 4.1 km || 
|-id=658 bgcolor=#fefefe
| 38658 ||  || — || July 31, 2000 || Socorro || LINEAR || — || align=right | 2.4 km || 
|-id=659 bgcolor=#E9E9E9
| 38659 ||  || — || July 31, 2000 || Socorro || LINEAR || — || align=right | 4.8 km || 
|-id=660 bgcolor=#E9E9E9
| 38660 ||  || — || July 31, 2000 || Socorro || LINEAR || EUN || align=right | 3.0 km || 
|-id=661 bgcolor=#fefefe
| 38661 ||  || — || July 31, 2000 || Socorro || LINEAR || — || align=right | 2.2 km || 
|-id=662 bgcolor=#fefefe
| 38662 ||  || — || July 31, 2000 || Socorro || LINEAR || — || align=right | 2.2 km || 
|-id=663 bgcolor=#fefefe
| 38663 ||  || — || July 31, 2000 || Socorro || LINEAR || — || align=right | 3.0 km || 
|-id=664 bgcolor=#fefefe
| 38664 ||  || — || July 31, 2000 || Socorro || LINEAR || — || align=right | 2.4 km || 
|-id=665 bgcolor=#E9E9E9
| 38665 ||  || — || July 31, 2000 || Socorro || LINEAR || — || align=right | 2.9 km || 
|-id=666 bgcolor=#fefefe
| 38666 ||  || — || July 31, 2000 || Socorro || LINEAR || NYS || align=right | 2.1 km || 
|-id=667 bgcolor=#E9E9E9
| 38667 ||  || — || July 29, 2000 || Anderson Mesa || LONEOS || — || align=right | 2.0 km || 
|-id=668 bgcolor=#fefefe
| 38668 || 2000 PM || — || August 1, 2000 || Reedy Creek || J. Broughton || — || align=right | 3.8 km || 
|-id=669 bgcolor=#E9E9E9
| 38669 Michikawa ||  ||  || August 3, 2000 || Bisei SG Center || BATTeRS || — || align=right | 2.6 km || 
|-id=670 bgcolor=#E9E9E9
| 38670 ||  || — || August 3, 2000 || Socorro || LINEAR || — || align=right | 6.9 km || 
|-id=671 bgcolor=#fefefe
| 38671 Verdaguer ||  ||  || August 7, 2000 || Ametlla de Mar || J. Nomen || NYS || align=right | 2.3 km || 
|-id=672 bgcolor=#fefefe
| 38672 ||  || — || August 2, 2000 || Socorro || LINEAR || — || align=right | 4.5 km || 
|-id=673 bgcolor=#fefefe
| 38673 ||  || — || August 3, 2000 || Socorro || LINEAR || MAS || align=right | 2.3 km || 
|-id=674 bgcolor=#fefefe
| 38674 Těšínsko ||  ||  || August 9, 2000 || Ondřejov || L. Kotková || — || align=right | 2.0 km || 
|-id=675 bgcolor=#E9E9E9
| 38675 ||  || — || August 1, 2000 || Socorro || LINEAR || — || align=right | 2.9 km || 
|-id=676 bgcolor=#E9E9E9
| 38676 ||  || — || August 1, 2000 || Socorro || LINEAR || — || align=right | 1.9 km || 
|-id=677 bgcolor=#fefefe
| 38677 ||  || — || August 3, 2000 || Socorro || LINEAR || NYS || align=right | 1.9 km || 
|-id=678 bgcolor=#E9E9E9
| 38678 ||  || — || August 5, 2000 || Haleakala || NEAT || ADE || align=right | 7.2 km || 
|-id=679 bgcolor=#fefefe
| 38679 || 2000 QX || — || August 22, 2000 || Gnosca || S. Sposetti || — || align=right | 2.3 km || 
|-id=680 bgcolor=#fefefe
| 38680 ||  || — || August 24, 2000 || Socorro || LINEAR || FLO || align=right | 3.1 km || 
|-id=681 bgcolor=#fefefe
| 38681 ||  || — || August 24, 2000 || Starkenburg Observatory || Starkenburg Obs. || — || align=right | 2.1 km || 
|-id=682 bgcolor=#fefefe
| 38682 ||  || — || August 24, 2000 || Socorro || LINEAR || H || align=right | 1.5 km || 
|-id=683 bgcolor=#FA8072
| 38683 ||  || — || August 25, 2000 || Socorro || LINEAR || — || align=right | 2.1 km || 
|-id=684 bgcolor=#d6d6d6
| 38684 Velehrad ||  ||  || August 25, 2000 || Ondřejov || P. Pravec, P. Kušnirák || SHU3:2 || align=right | 13 km || 
|-id=685 bgcolor=#E9E9E9
| 38685 ||  || — || August 26, 2000 || Ondřejov || P. Kušnirák, P. Pravec || KRM || align=right | 4.0 km || 
|-id=686 bgcolor=#fefefe
| 38686 ||  || — || August 24, 2000 || Socorro || LINEAR || — || align=right | 2.6 km || 
|-id=687 bgcolor=#fefefe
| 38687 ||  || — || August 24, 2000 || Socorro || LINEAR || — || align=right | 1.8 km || 
|-id=688 bgcolor=#fefefe
| 38688 ||  || — || August 25, 2000 || Socorro || LINEAR || NYS || align=right | 4.4 km || 
|-id=689 bgcolor=#fefefe
| 38689 ||  || — || August 24, 2000 || Socorro || LINEAR || FLO || align=right | 1.7 km || 
|-id=690 bgcolor=#fefefe
| 38690 ||  || — || August 24, 2000 || Socorro || LINEAR || — || align=right | 2.7 km || 
|-id=691 bgcolor=#fefefe
| 38691 ||  || — || August 25, 2000 || Socorro || LINEAR || V || align=right | 2.3 km || 
|-id=692 bgcolor=#fefefe
| 38692 ||  || — || August 25, 2000 || Socorro || LINEAR || — || align=right | 4.3 km || 
|-id=693 bgcolor=#fefefe
| 38693 ||  || — || August 24, 2000 || Socorro || LINEAR || — || align=right | 2.0 km || 
|-id=694 bgcolor=#E9E9E9
| 38694 ||  || — || August 24, 2000 || Socorro || LINEAR || — || align=right | 2.6 km || 
|-id=695 bgcolor=#fefefe
| 38695 ||  || — || August 24, 2000 || Socorro || LINEAR || NYS || align=right | 1.9 km || 
|-id=696 bgcolor=#fefefe
| 38696 ||  || — || August 26, 2000 || Socorro || LINEAR || V || align=right | 1.6 km || 
|-id=697 bgcolor=#fefefe
| 38697 ||  || — || August 28, 2000 || Socorro || LINEAR || FLO || align=right | 1.4 km || 
|-id=698 bgcolor=#fefefe
| 38698 ||  || — || August 28, 2000 || Socorro || LINEAR || — || align=right | 2.4 km || 
|-id=699 bgcolor=#fefefe
| 38699 ||  || — || August 28, 2000 || Socorro || LINEAR || V || align=right | 2.2 km || 
|-id=700 bgcolor=#fefefe
| 38700 ||  || — || August 28, 2000 || Socorro || LINEAR || V || align=right | 2.0 km || 
|}

38701–38800 

|-bgcolor=#d6d6d6
| 38701 ||  || — || August 28, 2000 || Socorro || LINEAR || HIL3:2slow || align=right | 22 km || 
|-id=702 bgcolor=#fefefe
| 38702 ||  || — || August 28, 2000 || Socorro || LINEAR || NYS || align=right | 2.0 km || 
|-id=703 bgcolor=#fefefe
| 38703 ||  || — || August 24, 2000 || Socorro || LINEAR || — || align=right | 1.5 km || 
|-id=704 bgcolor=#fefefe
| 38704 ||  || — || August 24, 2000 || Socorro || LINEAR || NYS || align=right | 1.8 km || 
|-id=705 bgcolor=#fefefe
| 38705 ||  || — || August 24, 2000 || Socorro || LINEAR || — || align=right | 2.3 km || 
|-id=706 bgcolor=#fefefe
| 38706 ||  || — || August 24, 2000 || Socorro || LINEAR || V || align=right | 2.5 km || 
|-id=707 bgcolor=#fefefe
| 38707 ||  || — || August 25, 2000 || Socorro || LINEAR || V || align=right | 2.3 km || 
|-id=708 bgcolor=#fefefe
| 38708 ||  || — || August 25, 2000 || Socorro || LINEAR || FLO || align=right | 1.8 km || 
|-id=709 bgcolor=#d6d6d6
| 38709 ||  || — || August 25, 2000 || Socorro || LINEAR || 3:2 || align=right | 13 km || 
|-id=710 bgcolor=#fefefe
| 38710 ||  || — || August 28, 2000 || Socorro || LINEAR || FLO || align=right | 2.0 km || 
|-id=711 bgcolor=#E9E9E9
| 38711 ||  || — || August 28, 2000 || Socorro || LINEAR || — || align=right | 4.7 km || 
|-id=712 bgcolor=#fefefe
| 38712 ||  || — || August 28, 2000 || Socorro || LINEAR || — || align=right | 2.1 km || 
|-id=713 bgcolor=#fefefe
| 38713 ||  || — || August 28, 2000 || Socorro || LINEAR || — || align=right | 2.4 km || 
|-id=714 bgcolor=#fefefe
| 38714 ||  || — || August 28, 2000 || Socorro || LINEAR || — || align=right | 2.8 km || 
|-id=715 bgcolor=#fefefe
| 38715 ||  || — || August 25, 2000 || Socorro || LINEAR || V || align=right | 2.0 km || 
|-id=716 bgcolor=#fefefe
| 38716 ||  || — || August 25, 2000 || Socorro || LINEAR || — || align=right | 2.4 km || 
|-id=717 bgcolor=#d6d6d6
| 38717 ||  || — || August 25, 2000 || Socorro || LINEAR || — || align=right | 9.8 km || 
|-id=718 bgcolor=#E9E9E9
| 38718 ||  || — || August 25, 2000 || Socorro || LINEAR || — || align=right | 3.2 km || 
|-id=719 bgcolor=#fefefe
| 38719 ||  || — || August 24, 2000 || Socorro || LINEAR || — || align=right | 2.5 km || 
|-id=720 bgcolor=#fefefe
| 38720 ||  || — || August 24, 2000 || Socorro || LINEAR || V || align=right | 2.0 km || 
|-id=721 bgcolor=#fefefe
| 38721 ||  || — || August 25, 2000 || Socorro || LINEAR || — || align=right | 3.3 km || 
|-id=722 bgcolor=#E9E9E9
| 38722 ||  || — || August 25, 2000 || Socorro || LINEAR || — || align=right | 3.0 km || 
|-id=723 bgcolor=#fefefe
| 38723 ||  || — || August 30, 2000 || Višnjan Observatory || K. Korlević || V || align=right | 3.4 km || 
|-id=724 bgcolor=#fefefe
| 38724 ||  || — || August 31, 2000 || Reedy Creek || J. Broughton || — || align=right | 2.7 km || 
|-id=725 bgcolor=#d6d6d6
| 38725 ||  || — || August 31, 2000 || Socorro || LINEAR || — || align=right | 8.7 km || 
|-id=726 bgcolor=#fefefe
| 38726 ||  || — || August 24, 2000 || Socorro || LINEAR || V || align=right | 2.1 km || 
|-id=727 bgcolor=#fefefe
| 38727 ||  || — || August 25, 2000 || Socorro || LINEAR || — || align=right | 1.4 km || 
|-id=728 bgcolor=#fefefe
| 38728 ||  || — || August 26, 2000 || Socorro || LINEAR || — || align=right | 1.7 km || 
|-id=729 bgcolor=#fefefe
| 38729 ||  || — || August 31, 2000 || Socorro || LINEAR || — || align=right | 1.7 km || 
|-id=730 bgcolor=#E9E9E9
| 38730 ||  || — || August 31, 2000 || Socorro || LINEAR || — || align=right | 2.3 km || 
|-id=731 bgcolor=#fefefe
| 38731 ||  || — || August 31, 2000 || Socorro || LINEAR || NYS || align=right | 2.3 km || 
|-id=732 bgcolor=#fefefe
| 38732 ||  || — || August 31, 2000 || Socorro || LINEAR || V || align=right | 2.1 km || 
|-id=733 bgcolor=#fefefe
| 38733 ||  || — || August 31, 2000 || Socorro || LINEAR || V || align=right | 2.0 km || 
|-id=734 bgcolor=#fefefe
| 38734 ||  || — || August 31, 2000 || Socorro || LINEAR || NYS || align=right | 3.5 km || 
|-id=735 bgcolor=#E9E9E9
| 38735 ||  || — || August 31, 2000 || Socorro || LINEAR || — || align=right | 7.0 km || 
|-id=736 bgcolor=#fefefe
| 38736 ||  || — || August 31, 2000 || Socorro || LINEAR || FLO || align=right | 1.8 km || 
|-id=737 bgcolor=#fefefe
| 38737 ||  || — || August 31, 2000 || Socorro || LINEAR || — || align=right | 1.9 km || 
|-id=738 bgcolor=#fefefe
| 38738 ||  || — || August 31, 2000 || Socorro || LINEAR || — || align=right | 2.6 km || 
|-id=739 bgcolor=#fefefe
| 38739 ||  || — || August 24, 2000 || Socorro || LINEAR || — || align=right | 2.3 km || 
|-id=740 bgcolor=#fefefe
| 38740 ||  || — || August 26, 2000 || Socorro || LINEAR || NYS || align=right | 1.9 km || 
|-id=741 bgcolor=#E9E9E9
| 38741 ||  || — || August 31, 2000 || Socorro || LINEAR || EUN || align=right | 5.2 km || 
|-id=742 bgcolor=#fefefe
| 38742 ||  || — || August 26, 2000 || Socorro || LINEAR || — || align=right | 4.6 km || 
|-id=743 bgcolor=#fefefe
| 38743 ||  || — || August 26, 2000 || Socorro || LINEAR || — || align=right | 3.0 km || 
|-id=744 bgcolor=#fefefe
| 38744 ||  || — || August 26, 2000 || Socorro || LINEAR || — || align=right | 2.2 km || 
|-id=745 bgcolor=#fefefe
| 38745 ||  || — || August 26, 2000 || Socorro || LINEAR || FLO || align=right | 2.0 km || 
|-id=746 bgcolor=#fefefe
| 38746 ||  || — || August 26, 2000 || Socorro || LINEAR || V || align=right | 1.9 km || 
|-id=747 bgcolor=#fefefe
| 38747 ||  || — || August 26, 2000 || Socorro || LINEAR || — || align=right | 1.8 km || 
|-id=748 bgcolor=#fefefe
| 38748 ||  || — || August 26, 2000 || Socorro || LINEAR || — || align=right | 1.9 km || 
|-id=749 bgcolor=#fefefe
| 38749 ||  || — || August 31, 2000 || Socorro || LINEAR || — || align=right | 2.3 km || 
|-id=750 bgcolor=#E9E9E9
| 38750 ||  || — || August 31, 2000 || Socorro || LINEAR || — || align=right | 2.9 km || 
|-id=751 bgcolor=#fefefe
| 38751 ||  || — || August 31, 2000 || Socorro || LINEAR || — || align=right | 1.8 km || 
|-id=752 bgcolor=#fefefe
| 38752 ||  || — || August 31, 2000 || Socorro || LINEAR || MAS || align=right | 1.7 km || 
|-id=753 bgcolor=#fefefe
| 38753 ||  || — || August 31, 2000 || Socorro || LINEAR || — || align=right | 1.5 km || 
|-id=754 bgcolor=#fefefe
| 38754 ||  || — || August 31, 2000 || Socorro || LINEAR || — || align=right | 1.8 km || 
|-id=755 bgcolor=#E9E9E9
| 38755 ||  || — || August 31, 2000 || Socorro || LINEAR || — || align=right | 2.6 km || 
|-id=756 bgcolor=#E9E9E9
| 38756 ||  || — || August 31, 2000 || Socorro || LINEAR || RAF || align=right | 2.1 km || 
|-id=757 bgcolor=#fefefe
| 38757 ||  || — || September 1, 2000 || Socorro || LINEAR || NYS || align=right | 1.9 km || 
|-id=758 bgcolor=#fefefe
| 38758 ||  || — || September 1, 2000 || Socorro || LINEAR || — || align=right | 2.7 km || 
|-id=759 bgcolor=#fefefe
| 38759 ||  || — || September 1, 2000 || Socorro || LINEAR || V || align=right | 1.8 km || 
|-id=760 bgcolor=#fefefe
| 38760 ||  || — || September 1, 2000 || Socorro || LINEAR || — || align=right | 2.7 km || 
|-id=761 bgcolor=#d6d6d6
| 38761 ||  || — || September 1, 2000 || Socorro || LINEAR || — || align=right | 8.0 km || 
|-id=762 bgcolor=#fefefe
| 38762 ||  || — || September 1, 2000 || Socorro || LINEAR || — || align=right | 4.0 km || 
|-id=763 bgcolor=#fefefe
| 38763 ||  || — || September 1, 2000 || Socorro || LINEAR || MAS || align=right | 2.5 km || 
|-id=764 bgcolor=#fefefe
| 38764 ||  || — || September 1, 2000 || Socorro || LINEAR || — || align=right | 5.4 km || 
|-id=765 bgcolor=#E9E9E9
| 38765 ||  || — || September 1, 2000 || Socorro || LINEAR || GEF || align=right | 3.5 km || 
|-id=766 bgcolor=#fefefe
| 38766 ||  || — || September 1, 2000 || Socorro || LINEAR || FLO || align=right | 2.7 km || 
|-id=767 bgcolor=#E9E9E9
| 38767 ||  || — || September 1, 2000 || Socorro || LINEAR || — || align=right | 2.9 km || 
|-id=768 bgcolor=#fefefe
| 38768 ||  || — || September 1, 2000 || Socorro || LINEAR || MAS || align=right | 2.7 km || 
|-id=769 bgcolor=#E9E9E9
| 38769 ||  || — || September 1, 2000 || Socorro || LINEAR || — || align=right | 8.0 km || 
|-id=770 bgcolor=#E9E9E9
| 38770 ||  || — || September 1, 2000 || Socorro || LINEAR || HNA || align=right | 7.3 km || 
|-id=771 bgcolor=#fefefe
| 38771 ||  || — || September 1, 2000 || Socorro || LINEAR || NYS || align=right | 3.1 km || 
|-id=772 bgcolor=#E9E9E9
| 38772 ||  || — || September 1, 2000 || Socorro || LINEAR || — || align=right | 4.3 km || 
|-id=773 bgcolor=#fefefe
| 38773 ||  || — || September 1, 2000 || Socorro || LINEAR || NYS || align=right | 2.3 km || 
|-id=774 bgcolor=#fefefe
| 38774 ||  || — || September 1, 2000 || Socorro || LINEAR || — || align=right | 3.6 km || 
|-id=775 bgcolor=#E9E9E9
| 38775 ||  || — || September 1, 2000 || Socorro || LINEAR || — || align=right | 4.6 km || 
|-id=776 bgcolor=#fefefe
| 38776 ||  || — || September 1, 2000 || Socorro || LINEAR || — || align=right | 1.7 km || 
|-id=777 bgcolor=#E9E9E9
| 38777 ||  || — || September 1, 2000 || Socorro || LINEAR || — || align=right | 2.4 km || 
|-id=778 bgcolor=#fefefe
| 38778 ||  || — || September 1, 2000 || Socorro || LINEAR || V || align=right | 2.2 km || 
|-id=779 bgcolor=#fefefe
| 38779 ||  || — || September 1, 2000 || Socorro || LINEAR || — || align=right | 1.7 km || 
|-id=780 bgcolor=#fefefe
| 38780 ||  || — || September 1, 2000 || Socorro || LINEAR || V || align=right | 1.9 km || 
|-id=781 bgcolor=#fefefe
| 38781 ||  || — || September 1, 2000 || Socorro || LINEAR || FLO || align=right | 1.9 km || 
|-id=782 bgcolor=#E9E9E9
| 38782 ||  || — || September 1, 2000 || Socorro || LINEAR || — || align=right | 4.6 km || 
|-id=783 bgcolor=#E9E9E9
| 38783 ||  || — || September 2, 2000 || Socorro || LINEAR || — || align=right | 4.1 km || 
|-id=784 bgcolor=#fefefe
| 38784 ||  || — || September 3, 2000 || Socorro || LINEAR || V || align=right | 1.4 km || 
|-id=785 bgcolor=#E9E9E9
| 38785 ||  || — || September 3, 2000 || Socorro || LINEAR || — || align=right | 6.2 km || 
|-id=786 bgcolor=#fefefe
| 38786 ||  || — || September 3, 2000 || Socorro || LINEAR || V || align=right | 2.1 km || 
|-id=787 bgcolor=#fefefe
| 38787 ||  || — || September 3, 2000 || Socorro || LINEAR || V || align=right | 1.9 km || 
|-id=788 bgcolor=#E9E9E9
| 38788 ||  || — || September 3, 2000 || Socorro || LINEAR || — || align=right | 4.1 km || 
|-id=789 bgcolor=#fefefe
| 38789 ||  || — || September 3, 2000 || Socorro || LINEAR || — || align=right | 4.0 km || 
|-id=790 bgcolor=#fefefe
| 38790 ||  || — || September 3, 2000 || Socorro || LINEAR || — || align=right | 3.7 km || 
|-id=791 bgcolor=#fefefe
| 38791 ||  || — || September 3, 2000 || Socorro || LINEAR || NYS || align=right | 6.3 km || 
|-id=792 bgcolor=#E9E9E9
| 38792 ||  || — || September 4, 2000 || Socorro || LINEAR || GEF || align=right | 3.5 km || 
|-id=793 bgcolor=#fefefe
| 38793 ||  || — || September 5, 2000 || Socorro || LINEAR || — || align=right | 2.4 km || 
|-id=794 bgcolor=#fefefe
| 38794 ||  || — || September 5, 2000 || Socorro || LINEAR || — || align=right | 3.5 km || 
|-id=795 bgcolor=#fefefe
| 38795 ||  || — || September 5, 2000 || Socorro || LINEAR || — || align=right | 4.9 km || 
|-id=796 bgcolor=#E9E9E9
| 38796 ||  || — || September 5, 2000 || Socorro || LINEAR || — || align=right | 6.0 km || 
|-id=797 bgcolor=#fefefe
| 38797 ||  || — || September 5, 2000 || Socorro || LINEAR || FLO || align=right | 2.5 km || 
|-id=798 bgcolor=#E9E9E9
| 38798 ||  || — || September 1, 2000 || Socorro || LINEAR || — || align=right | 4.9 km || 
|-id=799 bgcolor=#E9E9E9
| 38799 ||  || — || September 1, 2000 || Socorro || LINEAR || WIT || align=right | 3.1 km || 
|-id=800 bgcolor=#E9E9E9
| 38800 ||  || — || September 3, 2000 || Socorro || LINEAR || — || align=right | 5.9 km || 
|}

38801–38900 

|-bgcolor=#d6d6d6
| 38801 ||  || — || September 4, 2000 || Socorro || LINEAR || — || align=right | 3.0 km || 
|-id=802 bgcolor=#fefefe
| 38802 ||  || — || September 6, 2000 || Socorro || LINEAR || FLO || align=right | 2.5 km || 
|-id=803 bgcolor=#fefefe
| 38803 ||  || — || September 1, 2000 || Socorro || LINEAR || NYS || align=right | 3.3 km || 
|-id=804 bgcolor=#fefefe
| 38804 ||  || — || September 3, 2000 || Socorro || LINEAR || V || align=right | 2.3 km || 
|-id=805 bgcolor=#fefefe
| 38805 ||  || — || September 1, 2000 || Socorro || LINEAR || — || align=right | 2.1 km || 
|-id=806 bgcolor=#fefefe
| 38806 ||  || — || September 1, 2000 || Socorro || LINEAR || NYS || align=right | 2.3 km || 
|-id=807 bgcolor=#E9E9E9
| 38807 ||  || — || September 2, 2000 || Socorro || LINEAR || — || align=right | 5.2 km || 
|-id=808 bgcolor=#fefefe
| 38808 ||  || — || September 2, 2000 || Socorro || LINEAR || NYS || align=right | 1.5 km || 
|-id=809 bgcolor=#d6d6d6
| 38809 ||  || — || September 2, 2000 || Socorro || LINEAR || EOS || align=right | 7.4 km || 
|-id=810 bgcolor=#fefefe
| 38810 ||  || — || September 2, 2000 || Socorro || LINEAR || — || align=right | 4.4 km || 
|-id=811 bgcolor=#d6d6d6
| 38811 ||  || — || September 2, 2000 || Socorro || LINEAR || — || align=right | 4.6 km || 
|-id=812 bgcolor=#E9E9E9
| 38812 ||  || — || September 2, 2000 || Socorro || LINEAR || — || align=right | 3.4 km || 
|-id=813 bgcolor=#fefefe
| 38813 ||  || — || September 2, 2000 || Socorro || LINEAR || MAS || align=right | 3.2 km || 
|-id=814 bgcolor=#E9E9E9
| 38814 ||  || — || September 2, 2000 || Socorro || LINEAR || — || align=right | 4.4 km || 
|-id=815 bgcolor=#fefefe
| 38815 ||  || — || September 2, 2000 || Socorro || LINEAR || NYS || align=right | 4.6 km || 
|-id=816 bgcolor=#fefefe
| 38816 ||  || — || September 2, 2000 || Socorro || LINEAR || — || align=right | 2.5 km || 
|-id=817 bgcolor=#fefefe
| 38817 ||  || — || September 2, 2000 || Socorro || LINEAR || V || align=right | 1.7 km || 
|-id=818 bgcolor=#fefefe
| 38818 ||  || — || September 2, 2000 || Socorro || LINEAR || — || align=right | 3.0 km || 
|-id=819 bgcolor=#fefefe
| 38819 ||  || — || September 3, 2000 || Socorro || LINEAR || V || align=right | 2.5 km || 
|-id=820 bgcolor=#fefefe
| 38820 ||  || — || September 7, 2000 || Socorro || LINEAR || V || align=right | 2.1 km || 
|-id=821 bgcolor=#fefefe
| 38821 Linchinghsia ||  ||  || September 9, 2000 || Desert Beaver || W. K. Y. Yeung || FLO || align=right | 2.5 km || 
|-id=822 bgcolor=#fefefe
| 38822 ||  || — || September 1, 2000 || Socorro || LINEAR || V || align=right | 1.9 km || 
|-id=823 bgcolor=#d6d6d6
| 38823 ||  || — || September 2, 2000 || Anderson Mesa || LONEOS || — || align=right | 4.4 km || 
|-id=824 bgcolor=#fefefe
| 38824 ||  || — || September 3, 2000 || Socorro || LINEAR || — || align=right | 1.8 km || 
|-id=825 bgcolor=#fefefe
| 38825 ||  || — || September 3, 2000 || Socorro || LINEAR || V || align=right | 1.7 km || 
|-id=826 bgcolor=#fefefe
| 38826 ||  || — || September 3, 2000 || Socorro || LINEAR || — || align=right | 3.3 km || 
|-id=827 bgcolor=#fefefe
| 38827 ||  || — || September 4, 2000 || Anderson Mesa || LONEOS || — || align=right | 1.9 km || 
|-id=828 bgcolor=#fefefe
| 38828 ||  || — || September 4, 2000 || Anderson Mesa || LONEOS || — || align=right | 1.6 km || 
|-id=829 bgcolor=#fefefe
| 38829 ||  || — || September 4, 2000 || Anderson Mesa || LONEOS || V || align=right | 2.0 km || 
|-id=830 bgcolor=#d6d6d6
| 38830 ||  || — || September 5, 2000 || Anderson Mesa || LONEOS || 3:2 || align=right | 13 km || 
|-id=831 bgcolor=#E9E9E9
| 38831 ||  || — || September 7, 2000 || Socorro || LINEAR || EUN || align=right | 3.6 km || 
|-id=832 bgcolor=#E9E9E9
| 38832 ||  || — || September 7, 2000 || Socorro || LINEAR || — || align=right | 6.6 km || 
|-id=833 bgcolor=#E9E9E9
| 38833 || 2000 SC || — || September 17, 2000 || Socorro || LINEAR || BRU || align=right | 10 km || 
|-id=834 bgcolor=#d6d6d6
| 38834 ||  || — || September 18, 2000 || Socorro || LINEAR || — || align=right | 8.2 km || 
|-id=835 bgcolor=#E9E9E9
| 38835 ||  || — || September 20, 2000 || Haleakala || NEAT || EUN || align=right | 3.3 km || 
|-id=836 bgcolor=#E9E9E9
| 38836 ||  || — || September 23, 2000 || Socorro || LINEAR || — || align=right | 6.2 km || 
|-id=837 bgcolor=#E9E9E9
| 38837 ||  || — || September 26, 2000 || Višnjan Observatory || K. Korlević || — || align=right | 4.6 km || 
|-id=838 bgcolor=#fefefe
| 38838 ||  || — || September 24, 2000 || Socorro || LINEAR || — || align=right | 1.7 km || 
|-id=839 bgcolor=#fefefe
| 38839 ||  || — || September 24, 2000 || Socorro || LINEAR || — || align=right | 1.9 km || 
|-id=840 bgcolor=#E9E9E9
| 38840 ||  || — || September 24, 2000 || Socorro || LINEAR || EUN || align=right | 4.4 km || 
|-id=841 bgcolor=#fefefe
| 38841 ||  || — || September 26, 2000 || Črni Vrh || Črni Vrh || V || align=right | 2.2 km || 
|-id=842 bgcolor=#fefefe
| 38842 ||  || — || September 26, 2000 || Nachi-Katsuura || Nachi-Katsuura Obs. || FLO || align=right | 1.8 km || 
|-id=843 bgcolor=#fefefe
| 38843 ||  || — || September 23, 2000 || Socorro || LINEAR || FLO || align=right | 1.7 km || 
|-id=844 bgcolor=#fefefe
| 38844 ||  || — || September 24, 2000 || Socorro || LINEAR || — || align=right | 1.6 km || 
|-id=845 bgcolor=#E9E9E9
| 38845 ||  || — || September 24, 2000 || Socorro || LINEAR || — || align=right | 2.2 km || 
|-id=846 bgcolor=#fefefe
| 38846 ||  || — || September 24, 2000 || Socorro || LINEAR || NYS || align=right | 1.5 km || 
|-id=847 bgcolor=#E9E9E9
| 38847 ||  || — || September 24, 2000 || Socorro || LINEAR || MAR || align=right | 2.4 km || 
|-id=848 bgcolor=#fefefe
| 38848 ||  || — || September 24, 2000 || Socorro || LINEAR || V || align=right | 1.2 km || 
|-id=849 bgcolor=#fefefe
| 38849 ||  || — || September 24, 2000 || Socorro || LINEAR || — || align=right | 2.5 km || 
|-id=850 bgcolor=#fefefe
| 38850 ||  || — || September 24, 2000 || Socorro || LINEAR || — || align=right | 1.6 km || 
|-id=851 bgcolor=#E9E9E9
| 38851 ||  || — || September 24, 2000 || Socorro || LINEAR || — || align=right | 2.3 km || 
|-id=852 bgcolor=#E9E9E9
| 38852 ||  || — || September 24, 2000 || Socorro || LINEAR || — || align=right | 2.6 km || 
|-id=853 bgcolor=#E9E9E9
| 38853 ||  || — || September 24, 2000 || Socorro || LINEAR || EUN || align=right | 3.1 km || 
|-id=854 bgcolor=#fefefe
| 38854 ||  || — || September 24, 2000 || Socorro || LINEAR || NYS || align=right | 1.9 km || 
|-id=855 bgcolor=#fefefe
| 38855 ||  || — || September 24, 2000 || Socorro || LINEAR || — || align=right | 2.4 km || 
|-id=856 bgcolor=#E9E9E9
| 38856 ||  || — || September 24, 2000 || Socorro || LINEAR || — || align=right | 2.2 km || 
|-id=857 bgcolor=#E9E9E9
| 38857 ||  || — || September 24, 2000 || Socorro || LINEAR || DOR || align=right | 6.8 km || 
|-id=858 bgcolor=#d6d6d6
| 38858 ||  || — || September 22, 2000 || Socorro || LINEAR || — || align=right | 13 km || 
|-id=859 bgcolor=#E9E9E9
| 38859 ||  || — || September 23, 2000 || Socorro || LINEAR || — || align=right | 6.8 km || 
|-id=860 bgcolor=#fefefe
| 38860 ||  || — || September 23, 2000 || Socorro || LINEAR || — || align=right | 2.1 km || 
|-id=861 bgcolor=#E9E9E9
| 38861 ||  || — || September 24, 2000 || Socorro || LINEAR || — || align=right | 2.3 km || 
|-id=862 bgcolor=#fefefe
| 38862 ||  || — || September 24, 2000 || Socorro || LINEAR || NYS || align=right | 2.7 km || 
|-id=863 bgcolor=#fefefe
| 38863 ||  || — || September 24, 2000 || Socorro || LINEAR || — || align=right | 4.9 km || 
|-id=864 bgcolor=#E9E9E9
| 38864 ||  || — || September 24, 2000 || Socorro || LINEAR || — || align=right | 2.8 km || 
|-id=865 bgcolor=#fefefe
| 38865 ||  || — || September 24, 2000 || Socorro || LINEAR || — || align=right | 1.9 km || 
|-id=866 bgcolor=#fefefe
| 38866 ||  || — || September 24, 2000 || Socorro || LINEAR || — || align=right | 1.7 km || 
|-id=867 bgcolor=#d6d6d6
| 38867 ||  || — || September 24, 2000 || Socorro || LINEAR || — || align=right | 5.1 km || 
|-id=868 bgcolor=#fefefe
| 38868 ||  || — || September 24, 2000 || Socorro || LINEAR || — || align=right | 2.3 km || 
|-id=869 bgcolor=#fefefe
| 38869 ||  || — || September 24, 2000 || Socorro || LINEAR || FLO || align=right | 3.5 km || 
|-id=870 bgcolor=#E9E9E9
| 38870 ||  || — || September 24, 2000 || Socorro || LINEAR || — || align=right | 3.5 km || 
|-id=871 bgcolor=#fefefe
| 38871 ||  || — || September 24, 2000 || Socorro || LINEAR || — || align=right | 7.3 km || 
|-id=872 bgcolor=#d6d6d6
| 38872 ||  || — || September 24, 2000 || Socorro || LINEAR || — || align=right | 8.5 km || 
|-id=873 bgcolor=#E9E9E9
| 38873 ||  || — || September 24, 2000 || Socorro || LINEAR || — || align=right | 2.8 km || 
|-id=874 bgcolor=#fefefe
| 38874 ||  || — || September 24, 2000 || Socorro || LINEAR || FLO || align=right | 1.7 km || 
|-id=875 bgcolor=#d6d6d6
| 38875 ||  || — || September 24, 2000 || Socorro || LINEAR || — || align=right | 5.8 km || 
|-id=876 bgcolor=#fefefe
| 38876 ||  || — || September 24, 2000 || Socorro || LINEAR || V || align=right | 1.7 km || 
|-id=877 bgcolor=#fefefe
| 38877 ||  || — || September 24, 2000 || Socorro || LINEAR || — || align=right | 2.4 km || 
|-id=878 bgcolor=#E9E9E9
| 38878 ||  || — || September 24, 2000 || Socorro || LINEAR || — || align=right | 3.7 km || 
|-id=879 bgcolor=#fefefe
| 38879 ||  || — || September 24, 2000 || Socorro || LINEAR || V || align=right | 2.0 km || 
|-id=880 bgcolor=#E9E9E9
| 38880 ||  || — || September 24, 2000 || Socorro || LINEAR || — || align=right | 5.1 km || 
|-id=881 bgcolor=#E9E9E9
| 38881 ||  || — || September 24, 2000 || Socorro || LINEAR || — || align=right | 2.1 km || 
|-id=882 bgcolor=#fefefe
| 38882 ||  || — || September 24, 2000 || Socorro || LINEAR || FLO || align=right | 2.4 km || 
|-id=883 bgcolor=#fefefe
| 38883 ||  || — || September 24, 2000 || Socorro || LINEAR || — || align=right | 4.4 km || 
|-id=884 bgcolor=#fefefe
| 38884 ||  || — || September 24, 2000 || Socorro || LINEAR || — || align=right | 2.1 km || 
|-id=885 bgcolor=#E9E9E9
| 38885 ||  || — || September 24, 2000 || Socorro || LINEAR || — || align=right | 4.9 km || 
|-id=886 bgcolor=#d6d6d6
| 38886 ||  || — || September 24, 2000 || Socorro || LINEAR || — || align=right | 5.2 km || 
|-id=887 bgcolor=#d6d6d6
| 38887 ||  || — || September 23, 2000 || Socorro || LINEAR || — || align=right | 7.3 km || 
|-id=888 bgcolor=#E9E9E9
| 38888 ||  || — || September 23, 2000 || Socorro || LINEAR || — || align=right | 3.5 km || 
|-id=889 bgcolor=#fefefe
| 38889 ||  || — || September 24, 2000 || Socorro || LINEAR || V || align=right | 1.8 km || 
|-id=890 bgcolor=#fefefe
| 38890 ||  || — || September 24, 2000 || Socorro || LINEAR || — || align=right | 3.4 km || 
|-id=891 bgcolor=#E9E9E9
| 38891 ||  || — || September 24, 2000 || Socorro || LINEAR || — || align=right | 4.5 km || 
|-id=892 bgcolor=#E9E9E9
| 38892 ||  || — || September 24, 2000 || Socorro || LINEAR || HNS || align=right | 3.2 km || 
|-id=893 bgcolor=#E9E9E9
| 38893 ||  || — || September 24, 2000 || Socorro || LINEAR || — || align=right | 2.5 km || 
|-id=894 bgcolor=#E9E9E9
| 38894 ||  || — || September 24, 2000 || Socorro || LINEAR || — || align=right | 5.7 km || 
|-id=895 bgcolor=#fefefe
| 38895 ||  || — || September 24, 2000 || Socorro || LINEAR || V || align=right | 1.9 km || 
|-id=896 bgcolor=#E9E9E9
| 38896 ||  || — || September 24, 2000 || Socorro || LINEAR || — || align=right | 2.0 km || 
|-id=897 bgcolor=#fefefe
| 38897 ||  || — || September 24, 2000 || Socorro || LINEAR || MAS || align=right | 2.4 km || 
|-id=898 bgcolor=#fefefe
| 38898 ||  || — || September 24, 2000 || Socorro || LINEAR || NYS || align=right | 1.7 km || 
|-id=899 bgcolor=#fefefe
| 38899 ||  || — || September 26, 2000 || Socorro || LINEAR || — || align=right | 2.0 km || 
|-id=900 bgcolor=#fefefe
| 38900 ||  || — || September 26, 2000 || Socorro || LINEAR || — || align=right | 4.5 km || 
|}

38901–39000 

|-bgcolor=#fefefe
| 38901 ||  || — || September 27, 2000 || Socorro || LINEAR || — || align=right | 1.9 km || 
|-id=902 bgcolor=#E9E9E9
| 38902 ||  || — || September 22, 2000 || Kitt Peak || Spacewatch || HNS || align=right | 2.3 km || 
|-id=903 bgcolor=#d6d6d6
| 38903 ||  || — || September 27, 2000 || Socorro || LINEAR || AEG || align=right | 11 km || 
|-id=904 bgcolor=#E9E9E9
| 38904 ||  || — || September 21, 2000 || Haleakala || NEAT || — || align=right | 5.4 km || 
|-id=905 bgcolor=#E9E9E9
| 38905 ||  || — || September 23, 2000 || Socorro || LINEAR || — || align=right | 2.4 km || 
|-id=906 bgcolor=#fefefe
| 38906 ||  || — || September 23, 2000 || Socorro || LINEAR || V || align=right | 2.1 km || 
|-id=907 bgcolor=#d6d6d6
| 38907 ||  || — || September 24, 2000 || Socorro || LINEAR || — || align=right | 5.8 km || 
|-id=908 bgcolor=#fefefe
| 38908 ||  || — || September 24, 2000 || Socorro || LINEAR || — || align=right | 3.1 km || 
|-id=909 bgcolor=#d6d6d6
| 38909 ||  || — || September 27, 2000 || Socorro || LINEAR || — || align=right | 15 km || 
|-id=910 bgcolor=#d6d6d6
| 38910 ||  || — || September 28, 2000 || Socorro || LINEAR || — || align=right | 5.5 km || 
|-id=911 bgcolor=#fefefe
| 38911 ||  || — || September 28, 2000 || Socorro || LINEAR || — || align=right | 3.5 km || 
|-id=912 bgcolor=#fefefe
| 38912 ||  || — || September 28, 2000 || Socorro || LINEAR || — || align=right | 8.3 km || 
|-id=913 bgcolor=#E9E9E9
| 38913 ||  || — || September 20, 2000 || Haleakala || NEAT || EUN || align=right | 2.9 km || 
|-id=914 bgcolor=#fefefe
| 38914 ||  || — || September 21, 2000 || Kitt Peak || Spacewatch || V || align=right | 1.9 km || 
|-id=915 bgcolor=#E9E9E9
| 38915 ||  || — || September 22, 2000 || Haleakala || NEAT || MIT || align=right | 6.2 km || 
|-id=916 bgcolor=#d6d6d6
| 38916 ||  || — || September 22, 2000 || Haleakala || NEAT || ALA || align=right | 7.5 km || 
|-id=917 bgcolor=#fefefe
| 38917 ||  || — || September 23, 2000 || Kitt Peak || Spacewatch || — || align=right | 3.2 km || 
|-id=918 bgcolor=#fefefe
| 38918 ||  || — || September 24, 2000 || Socorro || LINEAR || NYS || align=right | 1.6 km || 
|-id=919 bgcolor=#E9E9E9
| 38919 ||  || — || September 26, 2000 || Socorro || LINEAR || EUN || align=right | 4.7 km || 
|-id=920 bgcolor=#E9E9E9
| 38920 ||  || — || September 26, 2000 || Socorro || LINEAR || MAR || align=right | 3.4 km || 
|-id=921 bgcolor=#E9E9E9
| 38921 ||  || — || September 26, 2000 || Socorro || LINEAR || — || align=right | 7.4 km || 
|-id=922 bgcolor=#fefefe
| 38922 ||  || — || September 26, 2000 || Socorro || LINEAR || V || align=right | 1.6 km || 
|-id=923 bgcolor=#E9E9E9
| 38923 ||  || — || September 26, 2000 || Socorro || LINEAR || — || align=right | 3.3 km || 
|-id=924 bgcolor=#d6d6d6
| 38924 ||  || — || September 26, 2000 || Socorro || LINEAR || — || align=right | 5.7 km || 
|-id=925 bgcolor=#fefefe
| 38925 ||  || — || September 26, 2000 || Socorro || LINEAR || — || align=right | 2.5 km || 
|-id=926 bgcolor=#E9E9E9
| 38926 ||  || — || September 27, 2000 || Socorro || LINEAR || — || align=right | 4.3 km || 
|-id=927 bgcolor=#d6d6d6
| 38927 ||  || — || September 27, 2000 || Socorro || LINEAR || EOS || align=right | 4.7 km || 
|-id=928 bgcolor=#d6d6d6
| 38928 ||  || — || September 27, 2000 || Socorro || LINEAR || URS || align=right | 7.8 km || 
|-id=929 bgcolor=#E9E9E9
| 38929 ||  || — || September 27, 2000 || Socorro || LINEAR || EUN || align=right | 3.3 km || 
|-id=930 bgcolor=#E9E9E9
| 38930 ||  || — || September 28, 2000 || Socorro || LINEAR || — || align=right | 2.6 km || 
|-id=931 bgcolor=#E9E9E9
| 38931 ||  || — || September 24, 2000 || Socorro || LINEAR || GEF || align=right | 4.2 km || 
|-id=932 bgcolor=#E9E9E9
| 38932 ||  || — || September 24, 2000 || Socorro || LINEAR || — || align=right | 4.8 km || 
|-id=933 bgcolor=#fefefe
| 38933 ||  || — || September 24, 2000 || Socorro || LINEAR || — || align=right | 2.4 km || 
|-id=934 bgcolor=#fefefe
| 38934 ||  || — || September 26, 2000 || Socorro || LINEAR || V || align=right | 1.6 km || 
|-id=935 bgcolor=#E9E9E9
| 38935 ||  || — || September 26, 2000 || Socorro || LINEAR || DOR || align=right | 7.4 km || 
|-id=936 bgcolor=#E9E9E9
| 38936 ||  || — || September 24, 2000 || Socorro || LINEAR || — || align=right | 2.6 km || 
|-id=937 bgcolor=#E9E9E9
| 38937 ||  || — || September 24, 2000 || Socorro || LINEAR || — || align=right | 4.9 km || 
|-id=938 bgcolor=#fefefe
| 38938 ||  || — || September 24, 2000 || Socorro || LINEAR || — || align=right | 1.9 km || 
|-id=939 bgcolor=#E9E9E9
| 38939 ||  || — || September 24, 2000 || Socorro || LINEAR || AER || align=right | 3.2 km || 
|-id=940 bgcolor=#fefefe
| 38940 ||  || — || September 26, 2000 || Socorro || LINEAR || FLO || align=right | 2.3 km || 
|-id=941 bgcolor=#fefefe
| 38941 ||  || — || September 27, 2000 || Socorro || LINEAR || — || align=right | 2.5 km || 
|-id=942 bgcolor=#fefefe
| 38942 ||  || — || September 27, 2000 || Socorro || LINEAR || ERI || align=right | 5.0 km || 
|-id=943 bgcolor=#E9E9E9
| 38943 ||  || — || September 28, 2000 || Socorro || LINEAR || — || align=right | 3.0 km || 
|-id=944 bgcolor=#E9E9E9
| 38944 ||  || — || September 28, 2000 || Socorro || LINEAR || — || align=right | 6.1 km || 
|-id=945 bgcolor=#fefefe
| 38945 ||  || — || September 28, 2000 || Socorro || LINEAR || — || align=right | 2.2 km || 
|-id=946 bgcolor=#fefefe
| 38946 ||  || — || September 28, 2000 || Socorro || LINEAR || — || align=right | 4.0 km || 
|-id=947 bgcolor=#fefefe
| 38947 ||  || — || September 26, 2000 || Socorro || LINEAR || — || align=right | 4.3 km || 
|-id=948 bgcolor=#E9E9E9
| 38948 ||  || — || September 27, 2000 || Socorro || LINEAR || — || align=right | 3.9 km || 
|-id=949 bgcolor=#E9E9E9
| 38949 ||  || — || September 27, 2000 || Socorro || LINEAR || — || align=right | 3.3 km || 
|-id=950 bgcolor=#fefefe
| 38950 ||  || — || September 27, 2000 || Socorro || LINEAR || — || align=right | 3.9 km || 
|-id=951 bgcolor=#fefefe
| 38951 ||  || — || September 27, 2000 || Socorro || LINEAR || — || align=right | 2.7 km || 
|-id=952 bgcolor=#fefefe
| 38952 ||  || — || September 30, 2000 || Socorro || LINEAR || V || align=right | 1.4 km || 
|-id=953 bgcolor=#fefefe
| 38953 ||  || — || September 26, 2000 || Socorro || LINEAR || PHO || align=right | 2.9 km || 
|-id=954 bgcolor=#E9E9E9
| 38954 ||  || — || September 27, 2000 || Socorro || LINEAR || — || align=right | 3.9 km || 
|-id=955 bgcolor=#E9E9E9
| 38955 ||  || — || September 26, 2000 || Socorro || LINEAR || — || align=right | 5.8 km || 
|-id=956 bgcolor=#E9E9E9
| 38956 ||  || — || September 26, 2000 || Haleakala || NEAT || MAR || align=right | 3.1 km || 
|-id=957 bgcolor=#fefefe
| 38957 ||  || — || September 26, 2000 || Haleakala || NEAT || V || align=right | 1.8 km || 
|-id=958 bgcolor=#E9E9E9
| 38958 ||  || — || September 25, 2000 || Kitt Peak || Spacewatch || — || align=right | 4.2 km || 
|-id=959 bgcolor=#fefefe
| 38959 ||  || — || September 20, 2000 || Kitt Peak || Spacewatch || — || align=right | 1.9 km || 
|-id=960 bgcolor=#d6d6d6
| 38960 Yeungchihung || 2000 TS ||  || October 2, 2000 || Desert Beaver || W. K. Y. Yeung || — || align=right | 7.6 km || 
|-id=961 bgcolor=#E9E9E9
| 38961 ||  || — || October 1, 2000 || Ametlla de Mar || J. Nomen || — || align=right | 2.7 km || 
|-id=962 bgcolor=#E9E9E9
| 38962 Chuwinghung ||  ||  || October 5, 2000 || Desert Beaver || W. K. Y. Yeung || DOR || align=right | 8.9 km || 
|-id=963 bgcolor=#d6d6d6
| 38963 ||  || — || October 1, 2000 || Socorro || LINEAR || KOR || align=right | 3.3 km || 
|-id=964 bgcolor=#E9E9E9
| 38964 ||  || — || October 1, 2000 || Socorro || LINEAR || HEN || align=right | 2.1 km || 
|-id=965 bgcolor=#E9E9E9
| 38965 ||  || — || October 3, 2000 || Socorro || LINEAR || — || align=right | 3.3 km || 
|-id=966 bgcolor=#E9E9E9
| 38966 Deller ||  ||  || October 6, 2000 || Anderson Mesa || LONEOS || VIB || align=right | 4.5 km || 
|-id=967 bgcolor=#E9E9E9
| 38967 ||  || — || October 6, 2000 || Anderson Mesa || LONEOS || — || align=right | 3.6 km || 
|-id=968 bgcolor=#E9E9E9
| 38968 ||  || — || October 1, 2000 || Socorro || LINEAR || — || align=right | 4.2 km || 
|-id=969 bgcolor=#fefefe
| 38969 ||  || — || October 1, 2000 || Socorro || LINEAR || — || align=right | 1.9 km || 
|-id=970 bgcolor=#E9E9E9
| 38970 ||  || — || October 2, 2000 || Socorro || LINEAR || — || align=right | 2.3 km || 
|-id=971 bgcolor=#E9E9E9
| 38971 ||  || — || October 2, 2000 || Anderson Mesa || LONEOS || MAR || align=right | 3.1 km || 
|-id=972 bgcolor=#fefefe
| 38972 ||  || — || October 2, 2000 || Anderson Mesa || LONEOS || — || align=right | 5.4 km || 
|-id=973 bgcolor=#E9E9E9
| 38973 ||  || — || October 2, 2000 || Anderson Mesa || LONEOS || — || align=right | 4.2 km || 
|-id=974 bgcolor=#fefefe
| 38974 ||  || — || October 2, 2000 || Socorro || LINEAR || — || align=right | 1.9 km || 
|-id=975 bgcolor=#fefefe
| 38975 ||  || — || October 1, 2000 || Socorro || LINEAR || — || align=right | 1.4 km || 
|-id=976 bgcolor=#fefefe
| 38976 Taeve || 2000 UR ||  || October 21, 2000 || Drebach || G. Lehmann || — || align=right | 2.2 km || 
|-id=977 bgcolor=#d6d6d6
| 38977 || 2000 UV || — || October 21, 2000 || Višnjan Observatory || K. Korlević || THM || align=right | 6.0 km || 
|-id=978 bgcolor=#E9E9E9
| 38978 ||  || — || October 22, 2000 || Višnjan Observatory || K. Korlević || — || align=right | 4.0 km || 
|-id=979 bgcolor=#d6d6d6
| 38979 ||  || — || October 22, 2000 || Višnjan Observatory || K. Korlević || — || align=right | 6.9 km || 
|-id=980 bgcolor=#fefefe
| 38980 Gaoyaojie ||  ||  || October 23, 2000 || Desert Beaver || W. K. Y. Yeung || — || align=right | 3.4 km || 
|-id=981 bgcolor=#d6d6d6
| 38981 ||  || — || October 24, 2000 || Socorro || LINEAR || ALA || align=right | 9.4 km || 
|-id=982 bgcolor=#fefefe
| 38982 ||  || — || October 24, 2000 || Socorro || LINEAR || V || align=right | 2.3 km || 
|-id=983 bgcolor=#fefefe
| 38983 ||  || — || October 24, 2000 || Socorro || LINEAR || NYS || align=right | 2.7 km || 
|-id=984 bgcolor=#d6d6d6
| 38984 ||  || — || October 24, 2000 || Socorro || LINEAR || 2:1J || align=right | 6.4 km || 
|-id=985 bgcolor=#d6d6d6
| 38985 ||  || — || October 24, 2000 || Socorro || LINEAR || — || align=right | 5.4 km || 
|-id=986 bgcolor=#E9E9E9
| 38986 ||  || — || October 24, 2000 || Socorro || LINEAR || — || align=right | 3.5 km || 
|-id=987 bgcolor=#E9E9E9
| 38987 ||  || — || October 24, 2000 || Socorro || LINEAR || — || align=right | 3.0 km || 
|-id=988 bgcolor=#fefefe
| 38988 ||  || — || October 24, 2000 || Socorro || LINEAR || — || align=right | 2.8 km || 
|-id=989 bgcolor=#fefefe
| 38989 ||  || — || October 25, 2000 || Socorro || LINEAR || — || align=right | 2.5 km || 
|-id=990 bgcolor=#E9E9E9
| 38990 ||  || — || October 24, 2000 || Socorro || LINEAR || slow || align=right | 4.3 km || 
|-id=991 bgcolor=#E9E9E9
| 38991 ||  || — || October 29, 2000 || Socorro || LINEAR || ADE || align=right | 11 km || 
|-id=992 bgcolor=#d6d6d6
| 38992 ||  || — || October 24, 2000 || Socorro || LINEAR || KOR || align=right | 3.3 km || 
|-id=993 bgcolor=#fefefe
| 38993 ||  || — || October 24, 2000 || Socorro || LINEAR || — || align=right | 2.1 km || 
|-id=994 bgcolor=#E9E9E9
| 38994 ||  || — || October 24, 2000 || Socorro || LINEAR || — || align=right | 3.0 km || 
|-id=995 bgcolor=#E9E9E9
| 38995 ||  || — || October 24, 2000 || Socorro || LINEAR || — || align=right | 6.3 km || 
|-id=996 bgcolor=#fefefe
| 38996 ||  || — || October 24, 2000 || Socorro || LINEAR || — || align=right | 3.4 km || 
|-id=997 bgcolor=#E9E9E9
| 38997 ||  || — || October 24, 2000 || Socorro || LINEAR || MIT || align=right | 8.8 km || 
|-id=998 bgcolor=#E9E9E9
| 38998 ||  || — || October 24, 2000 || Socorro || LINEAR || EUN || align=right | 4.3 km || 
|-id=999 bgcolor=#E9E9E9
| 38999 ||  || — || October 24, 2000 || Socorro || LINEAR || slow || align=right | 6.4 km || 
|-id=000 bgcolor=#fefefe
| 39000 ||  || — || October 24, 2000 || Socorro || LINEAR || — || align=right | 1.8 km || 
|}

References

External links 
 Discovery Circumstances: Numbered Minor Planets (35001)–(40000) (IAU Minor Planet Center)

0038